The following is a list of characters appearing in Batman: The Brave and the Bold.

Heroes

'Mazing Man
 Voiced by Tom Kenny

A short man who dresses up as a superhero. In the "Kitty Catastrophe" segment of "Four Star Spectacular!", he is the accident-prone catsitter for a couple named Owen and Fiona. It is apparent that Batman is his favorite superhero and the inspiration for his costume.

Adam Strange
 Voiced by Michael T. Weiss

A human space adventurer who defends the planet Rann. He is married to Alanna, a native of the planet. He asks Batman and Aquaman for help in "Mystery In Space!" when the Gordanians attack Rann. The Gordanians capture his wife Alanna when the effects of the Zeta Ray wear off on him, and he goes to rescue her after his confidence is rekindled by Aquaman.

Ambush Bug
 Voiced by Henry Winkler

A superhero who has mental problems that prevent him from truly understanding reality around him, so even his true identity might be no more than a delusion on his part. He appears only in "Mitefall!", where he tries to stop Bat-Mite from getting Brave and the Bold cancelled. Despite his valiant efforts, the show is cancelled, but he manages to get together most of the characters for a goodbye party in the Batcave. He also appears to Bat-Mite to inform him that his actions will result in the end of his own existence, as Bat-Mite is too silly a character for a dark and gritty Batman series.

Anthro
A caveman hero. In "The Siege of Starro! Part One", he is featured in a teaser about heroes throughout history where he saves a tribe of cavepeople from Kru'll the Eternal.

Aquaman Family

Aquaman
 Voiced by John DiMaggio (normal voice), Ted McGinley (second voice in "Mitefall!")

Aquaman, also known as Arthur Curry, is the ruler of Atlantis, and a superhero. He is old friends with Batman. Aquaman first appears in "Evil Under the Sea!", where his older brother Orm hires assassin Black Manta to kill him. After Manta fails, Orm becomes the Ocean Master, and attacks his brother. Batman rescues Aquaman and they work together to defeat Black Manta. Though upset by his brother's betrayal, he refuses to give up on him because they are family. In "Journey to the Center of the Bat!", Aquaman works with the Atom to cure Batman of a virus, and shrinks down inside Batman's body to stop it. Aquaman later joins other heroes in "Game Over for Owlman!" to hunt down Batman, who is mistakenly wanted for Owlman's crimes. He is captured by Owlman, who tries to kill him by drying him out. He is saved by a high tech, futuristic Batman and helps defeat Black Manta. In "Mystery In Space!" he inadvertently joins Batman on a mission to the planet Rann to help Adam Strange battle the Gordanians when they try to conquer the planet. Aquaman is seen as depressed, after failing to save a beluga whale from a group of whalers. After recovering from his melancholy, he comes up with a plan to defeat the Gordanians, by having Batman teleport Earth's moon to Rann. In "Mayhem of the Music Meister!", Aquaman is one of three heroes who run afoul of the title villain and are hypnotically compelled to sing and obey the villains' commands. In "The Fate of Equinox!" one of the powers Batman gets is Aquaman's. In "Aquaman's Outrageous Adventure!", Aquaman and his family are on a road trip and eventually save Batman from The Penguin. In "Sidekicks Assemble!", Aquaman teams up with Batman and Green Arrow to battle Ra's al Ghul. In "The Criss Cross Conspiracy!" Aquaman help Batman and the Atom to battle the Bug-Eyed Bandit. He joins the Justice League International in "Darkseid Descending!". In "Mitefall!", Aquaman helps Batman and Ambush Bug fight Gorilla Grodd only for the battle to be disrupted when Bat-Mite plans to cancel the series. During this time, Bat-Mite changes his voice to that of Ted McGinley.

Aqualad
 Voiced by Zack Shada (adult), Zachary Gordon (young)

Aquaman's sidekick Aqualad, was mentioned in "The Color of Revenge!" when Batman was lecturing Robin. He finally appeared in the season two episode "Sidekicks Assemble!", shown to be far more aggressive and confrontational than in the comics. He teams up with Robin and Speedy against Ra's Al Ghul and Talia in the hopes to show their mentors that they deserve proper respect as heroes.

Mera
 Voiced by Sirena Irwin

Aquaman's wife, and the queen of Atlantis.

Arthur Jr.
 Voiced by Preston Strother

Aquaman and Mera's son who appeared in "Aquaman's Outrageous Adventure!". He acts like a stereotypical teenager, and is almost never seen without an iPod-esque music device in his ears and a scallop-shaped Nintendo DS-esque gaming system. His blue and white outfit is based on an alternate Aquaman costume that appeared in an Aquaman miniseries in the 1990s.

Atom
There were two superheroes called Atom. Each one wears a special belt that gives them the ability to grow and shrink in size.

Ray Palmer
 Voiced by Peter Scolari

Ray Palmer had been the original Atom and Ryan Choi's mentor, but eventually retired and moved to the Amazon. There, he encountered the Morlaidhans and princess Laethwyn. After teaming up with Batman, Ryan, and Aquaman to defeat a traitorous and Xenophobic Chancellor Deraegis, Ray chooses to stay in the Amazon as Laethwyn's lover.

Ryan Choi
 Voiced by James Sie

The current Atom is a superhero and friend of Batman. His secret identity is that of physicist Dr. Ryan Choi, a serious and calculating man. He helps Batman defeat the evil sorcerer Felix Faust. In "Journey to the Center of the Bat!", The Atom and Aquaman team up, shrink themselves, and enter Batman's body to fight a deadly virus. Although they initially dislike one another, The Atom and Aquaman eventually bond and succeed in their mission. In "Game Over for Owlman!" The Atom and other heroes hunt down Batman after being deceived by Owlman into believing that he had committed several crimes. Owlman and his allies eventually capture The Atom, along with a number of other heroes, and subject him to a device designed to kill him through use of an accelerated lead atom. The Atom is eventually freed by a western styled Batman and, in the ensuing melee, helps defeat Doctor Polaris. He makes a cameo appearance in "Aquaman's Outrageous Adventure!" battling the Bug-Eyed Bandit on Aquaman's windshield before the windshield wipers wipe them off. In "Sword of the Atom!", Ryan Choi had retired from being Atom when Aquaman comes to him at the time when Chronos has returned. Ryan and Aquaman go to South America where Batman went missing looking for Ray Palmer. After helping to defeat Chancellor Deraegis, Ryan returns to being Atom while Ray remains in the Amazon. Ryan even manages to defeat Chronos.

Batman Family

Batman
 Voiced by Diedrich Bader (adult), Zachary Gordon (young), Mikey Kelley (pre-teen), Tara Strong (toddler), Dee Bradley Baker (baby)

Batman (real name Bruce Wayne), a superhero clothed in a bat-motif, is the protagonist of the series and costumed protector of Gotham City. He is driven by guilt and revenge following the murder of his parents as a child. Batman spent his youth training in a plethora of fighting styles including boxing under Wildcat and Chinese martial arts under Wu Fei. During his training in the latter Batman met future ally Bronze Tiger and future foes Fox, Vulture, and Shark.

Batman is perhaps best known for the explicit emphasis he places on mental training and intelligence. He couples this with his parents' vast fortune, allowing him to create many advanced gadgets and vehicles. Though usually grim and serious, he is willing to work with others to foil villains but prefers to work alone. His close friends include Green Arrow, Blue Beetle, The Atom, Red Tornado, Aquaman, Plastic Man and B'Wana Beast. Wildcat was the one who trained him in the art of boxing. When undercover, he uses his Matches Malone identity.

The episode "Deep Cover for Batman!" reveals that Batman has an evil counterpart in an alternate universe. Going by the name Owlman, Batman's doppelgänger has succeeded in capturing the heroes of his world and in becoming the ruler as a result. In the following episode "Game Over for Owlman!", Batman travels to other alternate Earths and recruits other versions of himself.

When Batman is killed, Phantom Stranger assembles Nightwing, Jason Todd, Tim Drake, Damian Wayne, Stephanie Brown, and Carrie Kelly to resurrect Batman. Nightwing makes inspections on the other Robins and makes a comment on Jason and Damian's brutal fighting styles and Tim's detective skills. When Jason tries to leave, Damian threatens him by saying he will make his future happen a lot sooner. Additionally, Damian makes a jab about girls not being able to be Robin which is a reference to Stephanie's short tenure as Robin. The Robins then take Batman to the League of Assassins HQ to put Batman in the Lazarus Pit. While Tim and Stephanie stand guard, the others go inside until they are found out by the League. Ra's al Ghul arrives and lets them use the pit, not wanting Batman to die such an ignorable death. But Ra's hoped that the pit would drive Batman insane and kill the Robins, but Batman returns to normal.

Dick Grayson
 Voiced by Crawford Wilson (adult), Jeremy Shada (young), Lex Lang (as Batman II)

Previously Robin, Batman's classic sidekick, he fights crime in Blüdhaven - Gotham's economically troubled neighboring city. In his youth, Dick Grayson worked as a circus acrobat alongside his parents until they were tragically killed in an acrobatic accident. Still a mere boy, Dick found a home with Batman's alter-ego, Bruce Wayne. Eventually, he learned of the Caped Crusader's secret and donned a costume of his own. The partnership would not last, however, and when he got older the two went their separate ways. Nevertheless, the Dynamic Duo team up in "The Color of Revenge!" following Crazy Quilt's targeting of Robin. In the episode Robin claimed to have left due to the lack of respect, and throughout the episode demands that Batman give him the respect he deserves. Together they stop Crazy Quilt. Robin temporarily re-partnered with Batman to foil Killer Moth's hijack attempt on the Gotham Bank Money Train. In "Sidekicks Assemble!" Robin teams up with Speedy and Aqualad to battle against Ra's al Ghul and Talia, in the hopes of proving to their mentors that they deserve proper respect as superheroes. At the end of the episode, Dick gives up the Robin identity and becomes Nightwing (Batman suggesting the name for him at that time), wearing the original 'disco' style costume. In "Requiem for a Scarlet Speedster!" Kid Flash tells Batman to say hi to Nightwing.

In a book written by Alfred Pennyworth as seen in "The Knights of Tomorrow!", Nightwing has become Batman after Bruce Wayne retired. Nightwing later appears in The All-New Batman: The Brave and The Bold issue 13.

Barbara Gordon
 Voiced by Mae Whitman

Barbara Gordon is Bette Kane's successor as Batgirl. Batgirl was mentioned in a conversation between Jaime Reyes and his friend Paco in the episode "Night of the Huntress!". She appears in "The Last Patrol!" where she helps Batman defeat Killer Moth in a flashback. Batgirl plays a major role in "The Criss Cross Conspiracy!" where she helps Nightwing and Batman (who is in Batwoman's body) rescue Batwoman (in Batman's body) from the Riddler. She also makes a cameo appearance in The All-New Batman: The Brave and The Bold issue 13. When the Robins saves Batman, Madame Xanadu says that if the Robins failed, she would have sent the Batgirls to save Batman. Barbara appears alongside Cassandra Cain, Stephanie Brown, and Bette Kane, the Batgirls. It is speculated that she became the hacker Oracle, but recently returned to be Batgirl (which was not portrayed in the TV show and The All-New Batman: The Brave and The Bold comics)

Jason Todd
Jason Todd is Dick Grayson's successor as Robin. He appeared in The All-New Batman: The Brave and The Bold issue 13. It is speculated that in the same way that Dick became the hero Nightwing, Jason Todd becomes the second Red Hood (which was not portrayed in the TV show and The All-New Batman: The Brave and The Bold comics)

Tim Drake
Tim Drake is Jason Todd's successor as Robin. He appears in The All-New Batman: The Brave and The Bold issue 13.  It is speculated that in the same way that Dick and Jason became super heroes with their own heroic careers, Tim Drake started his career as the super hero Red Robin (which was not portrayed in the TV show and The All-New Batman: The Brave and The Bold comics)

Stephanie Brown
Stephanie is Tim Drake's successor as Robin and Cassandra Cain's successor as Batgirl. She appears in The All-New Batman: The Brave and The Bold issue 13. Stephanie later makes a cameo at the end. Madame Xanadu says that if the Robins failed, she would've sent the Batgirls. Stephanie appears alongside Barbara Gordon, Cassandra Cain, and Bette Kane, the Batgirls. It is speculated that she became the super heroine Spoiler (not portrayed in the TV show and The All-New Batman: The Brave and The Bold comics).

Carrie Kelly
Carrie Kelly is Damian Wayne's successor as Robin. She appears in The All-New Batman: The Brave and The Bold issue 13. When Batman dies, Phantom Stranger assembles Nightwing, Jason Todd, Tim Drake, Stephanie Brown, Damian Wayne, and Carrie. Nightwing takes the Robins to the League of Assassins HQ to put Batman in the Lazarus Pit. Ra's allows them to use the pit, hoping that the pit makes Batman insane and kill the Robins. Batman snaps out of it and leaves with the Robins. It is speculated that she became the super heroine Catgirl (not portrayed in the TV show and The All-New Batman: The Brave and The Bold comics).

Bette Kane
Bette is the first Bat-Girl (note variant spelling).  She makes a cameo at the end of The All-New Batman: The Brave and The Bold issue 13. Madame Xanadu says that if the Robins failed, she would've sent the Batgirls. Bette appears alongside Barbara Gordon, Cassandra Cain, and Stephanie Brown, the Batgirls. It is speculated that she became the super heroine Flamebird (not portrayed in the TV show and The All-New Batman: The Brave and The Bold comics).

Cassandra Cain
Cassandra Cain is Barbara Gordon's successor as Batgirl. She makes a cameo at the end of The All-New Batman: the Brave and The Bold issue 13. Madame Xanadus says that if the Robins had failed, she would've sent the Batgirls. Cassandra appears alongside Barbara Gordon, Bette Kane, and Stephanie Brown, the Batgirls. It is speculated that she became the super heroine Black Bat (not portrayed in the TV show and The All-New Batman: The Brave and The Bold comics).

Ace the Bat-Hound
 Voiced by Dee Bradley Baker

Batman's canine companion. In "Legends of the Dark Mite!", he helps Batman when Catman unleashes an endangered Sumatran Tiger on Batman. Ace fights the Sumatran Tiger and scares it off, and then corners Catman up a tree. Batman rewards Ace with a bat-shaped dog treat. Ace is later seen in the main plot of the episode, but he turns out to be Bat-Mite in disguise. Ace appears in "The Siege of Starro! Part One" where he attacks Booster Gold and had a Starro parasite put on him by the Faceless Hunter. In "The Plague of the Prototypes!", Ace is friends with Batman's prototype Bat-Robot Proto-Bot and encourages him to save Batman from Black Mask. Later, using his jet-pack, he helps Batman and Proto track down and de-activate Black Mask's bombs.

Batwoman
 Voiced by Vanessa Marshall

In this show, Batwoman is Katrina Moldoff, the heiress to the Moldoff Circus fortune. She is portrayed as a thrill seeker and a trained circus acrobat whom Batman dislikes due to her crime fighting occasionally endangering innocent bystanders. In the past, she helped Batman and Robin fight the Riddler only to have her mask ripped off and her identity to be exposed to a group of reporters on the scene. As a result, she was prohibited from fighting crime by the courts and spent the subsequent years later living incognito. Some years later, Katrina hears that the Riddler has escaped from prison. She visits Felix Faust's magic shop to obtain a spell to swap her body with Batman to work around her court-ordered inactivity and get revenge on the Riddler. Batman (in Katrina's body) is forced to assume the role of Batwoman to reverse the spell even bringing along Felix Faust along for the ride. However, Katrina is captured and almost killed by the Riddler, but is saved by Batman, Nightwing, Batgirl, and Felix Faust. She learns her lesson and goes along quietly to pay her debt to society. After Batwoman is loaded into the paddy wagon, Felix Faust shows some romance toward her even though Batman was in her body.

On Spring.me, director Ben Jones confirmed that the decision to rename the character was brought about after DC Comics voiced concerns about the episode's depiction of the character having a negative impact on the new Batwoman comic book series which is to be launched less than a month after the episode's initial air date.

Proto-Bot
 Voiced by Adam West

Proto-Bot is Batman's bumbling but powerful and competent Bat-Bot sidekick from "The Plague of the Prototypes!". When Black Mask and his henchman Taboo end up taking control of the other Bat-Bots, Batman had to bring Ace the Bathound and Proto-Bot along. They managed to destroy the Bat-Bots and defeat Black Mask. Batman then assigned Proto-Bot to help protect Earth from aliens that disguised their ships as meteors. Proto-Bot refers to himself as "Proto" in the third person.

Bat-Ape
An ordinary gorilla who Batman and Robin rescued from poachers. Since then, the gorilla has been helping Batman and Robin with crime in the jungle as Bat-Ape. In "Shadow of the Bat!", Bat-Ape helps Batman and Robin fight Catwoman and her pet black panther Hecate. Bat-Ape does battle with Hecate until she escapes with Catwoman. Batman thanked Bat-Ape for his assistance.

Damian Wayne
 Voiced by Patrick Cavanaugh

In this show, Damian Wayne is presented as the son of Bruce Wayne and Selina Kyle rather than the illegitimate child of Bruce and Talia al Ghul. He is initially portrayed as being reluctant to follow in his father's footsteps, telling his parents that he does not want them to plot out his life for him. After Bruce and Selina are killed by the Joker's successor when he bombed the Batman Museum, Damian takes up the Robin mantle and fights alongside Dick Grayson. Ultimately, the two bring the new Joker and the original, aged Joker to justice and save Gotham from a poison gas attack. The episode ends with an elderly Dick passing on the Batman mantle to Damian, who is shown fighting crime with his own son as the new Robin. It ultimately turns out that the events of this episode were part of a book that Alfred Pennyworth was writing titled "The Knights of Tomorrow!". Damian later appears in The All-New Batman: The Brave and The Bold issue 13.

Alternate Batmen
In "Game Over for Owlman!", Batman revealed that he had gathered an army of Batmen from other worlds in the multiverse who ended up helping him defeat Owlman and the villains that he assembled. They consist of:

 A vampire Batman (inspired by the comics story Batman & Dracula: Red Rain).
 A pirate-themed Batman (based on Detective Comics Annual #7).
 A big-headed psychic Batman (voiced by Greg Ellis).
 A super-strong "Hulk" Batman (inspired by The Brave and the Bold #68).
 A cowboy version of Batman inspired by the Justice Riders comics miniseries.
 A futuristic Batman inspired by Judge Dredd.

The vampire and Hulk-like Batmen briefly appear in "Legends of the Dark Mite!" when Batmite tries changing Batman's appearance.

There were also other Batmen who appeared around the end of "Night of the Batmen!":

 The Adam West version from Batman
 Batman from The New Scooby-Doo Movies
 Batman from the Super Friends series
 Batman from The Dark Knight Returns
 Batman from Batman: The Animated Series
 Batman from Batman & Robin
 Terry McGinnis from Batman Beyond
 Batman from The Batman

Batman of Zur-En-Arrh
 Voiced by Kevin Conroy

In "The Super-Batman of Planet X!", Batman lands on the planet Zur-En-Arrh and teams up with his alien counterpart to fight evil.

Bat-Mite
 Voiced by Paul Reubens

A creature from the Fifth Dimension, he is Batman's biggest fan. In "Legends of the Dark Mite!", he kidnaps him to shape him into a better hero. Some of this includes figuring out which villain to fight Batman, spicing up the firepower of the bank robbers and Calendar Man, and even toying with Batman. Near the end of the episode, Bat-Mite decides to leave Batman alone and bother Green Arrow instead, briefly becoming "Arrow-Mite." 

In "Emperor Joker!", Batman foils a robbery by the Ten-Eyed Man. Bat-Mite shows Batman the museum tribute to Batman and the Joker's rivalry. Bat-Mite frees Joker from Arkham Asylum so he can watch a fight between the two firsthand. Batman makes Bat-Mite promise not to use his powers and Batman confronts the Joker. When it seems Joker has the upper hand during a fight, Bat-Mite accidentally transfers his powers to the Joker. Bat-Mite is forced to watch helplessly as Joker uses his reality-warping powers to toy with Batman even when Joker creates Joker-Mite to deal with Bat-Mite. After Joker is tricked into giving Bat-Mite his powers back, Batman defeats Joker and his henchmen while Bat-Mite drags Joker-Mite to the Fifth Dimension.

In "Bat-Mite Presents: Batman's Strangest Cases!", Bat-Mite hosts a look at different renditions of Batman, including a Japanese manga version of the Dynamic Duo, and a team-up between the Dynamic Duo and Scooby-Doo in the style of The New Scooby-Doo Movies.

In “Mitefall”, Bat-Mite has grown weary of the campy “Brave and the Bold” Batman and hatches a plot to get the show canceled and replaced with a more gritty Batman. He inserts several “jump the shark” elements into the show, such as changing Aquaman's voice to that of Ted McGinley, giving Batman unusual costumes and guns, and moving the show to Malibu. Though his plan is successful, The Brave and the Bold is replaced with a CGI Batgirl series - featuring Batman as a guest character - and Bat-Mite fades from existence, since such an obscure and campy character wouldn't fit into a new, more gritty, series.

Batmen of All Nations
The Batmen of All Nations are a group of international superheroes inspired by Batman. Their lineup consists of:

 El Gaucho (voiced by Jeff Bennett) - A millionaire playboy from Buenos Aires, Argentina. Besides being an expert motorcyclist and horse rider, he is an expert at using bolos.
 Knight - Percy Sheldrake started out his superhero career as the squire for Shining Knight. As an adult, he became Knight and took over as a hero for England.
 Legionnaire (voiced by John DiMaggio) - Giovanni wears armor based on the armies of Ancient Rome and is the defender of Rome, Italy.
 Musketeer (voiced by Diedrich Bader) - A rapier-wielding hero and defender of Paris, France.
 Ranger - A bush ranger-based hero from Australia uses trick boomerangs to fight crime.
 Wingman - A hero of American and Swedish descent who was trained by Batman. He uses his cape to glide to give the illusion of flight.
 An unidentified South African Batman resembling Impala.

Batman was meeting with them when their headquarters is crashed by Joker and his team of Jokers called the Joker of All Nations.

Batmen Throughout Time
In "Time Out for Vengeance!", it is shown that Batman's ancestors throughout time have also had the same motive as him. Soldiers from the future called the Batmen Revenge Squad have been sent by a fragment of Equinox to try to erase Batman from the timeline by taking out his ancestors and descendants, but have been thwarted by the Justice League International. The historic Batmen are listed in order of appearance:

 Cave-Batman (voiced by Diedrich Bader) - A lone caveman who wears the pelt of a giant bat and rides a woolly mammoth to deliver justice in prehistoric times. He saved Guy Gardner and Ice from a Tyrannosaurus and they returned the favor by protecting him from the Batmen Revenge Squad.
 Pirate-Batman (voiced by Diedrich Bader) - In the 18th Century, a man became a pirate version of Batman to protect the Seven Seas. He did question Blue Beetle and Booster Gold of their trespassing until a Batman Revenge Squad member arrived and summoned a sea monster to attack the Pirate-Batman's ship. After being saved by Blue Beetle and Booster Gold, Pirate-Batman offered to make them members of his pirate crew which they declined.
 Batmanicus (voiced by Diedrich Bader) - An armored hero from Ancient Rome who stood up against slavery. Aquaman and Fire protected him from the Batmen Revenge Squad after he had saved them from slavers.
 Robot Batman (voiced by Diedrich Bader) - In the far future, a robot version of Batman was captured by the fragment of Equinox. When the Justice League International arrived to fight the fragment of Equinox, Robot Batman mustered up the strength to break free from his restraints and summoned the other three Batmen to help defeat the fragment of Equinox.

Black Canary
 Voiced by Grey DeLisle

A superheroine with hand-to-hand combat prowess and a supersonic scream. She appears in "Night of the Huntress!", helping Batman defeat Solomon Grundy.

In "Mayhem of the Music Meister!" she appears in the main plot and is the last remaining aide to Batman before being hypnotized herself after she rejects the Music Meister's romantic advances. Her voice was used to break his spell, and her and Green Arrow share a romantic moment among the destruction once she realizes that Batman does not share her feelings for her.

In "The Golden Age of Justice!", it is revealed that her mother was the original Black Canary, and a member of the Justice Society. She died rescuing people from a fire, and entrusted the Justice Society with taking care of her daughther, who became the current Black Canary. Both she and Batman were trained by the Justice Society in the beginning of their crimefighting careers. She is jealous of how they treat Batman as an equal (unaware of how critical they are of Batman, despite his abilities and crimefighting prowess), while treating her like a child. She later confronts Wildcat about this, who tells her the truth about her mother's death. After hearing the truth she manages to convince Wildcat to let her help the Justice Society fight their old nemesis, Per Degaton. Black Canary along with Wildcat, help save Batman and the rest of the Justice Society from Per Degaton and his robotic army. In "Sidekicks Assemble!" Black Canary is in the Justice League. In "The Mask of Matches Malone!", Black Canary appears along with Catwoman and Huntress to bring Batman out of his Matches Malone persona.

Black Orchid
A silent vigilante with a plant motif used in her crime-fighting. In "The Mask of Matches Malone!", she helps Batman in fighting the seductive Poison Ivy. After taking out her "flower children", she saves Batman from being killed by Poison Ivy. After a swift victory she disappears from sight, leaving Batman "knowing what Commissioner Gordon feels like".

Blue Beetle
One of the alien versions had previously fought space pirate Kanjar Ro, but died in the battle. The first human was archeologist Dan Garrett, who found the alien scarab that granted him powers, and became a hero.

Ted Kord
 Voiced by Wil Wheaton

After the death of Dan Garrett, his student the wealthy scientist Ted Kord vows to continue his legacy. However, Ted is unable to use the scarab on himself. Instead using his intelligence to create gadgets and become the Silver Age Blue Beetle. Looking to unlock the secrets of the scarab, he gives it to his scientist uncle Jarvis Kord. However, Jarvis plans to build a robot army instead, and while helping Batman foil his plans, Kord destroys a rocket ship with the robots on it, keeping the scarab safe at the cost of his own life.

In "Menace of the Madniks!", it is revealed that Booster Gold was friends with Ted Kord before his death.

Jaime Reyes
 Voiced by Will Friedle

The scarab eventually finds and bonds itself with teenager Jaime Reyes, and he becomes the third and current Blue Beetle, being the first human to use all the abilities of the Sacred Scarab. Reyes discovered that the scarab can morph into an alien battle suit allowing him to fight crime and travel in space. Batman mentors Reyes in how to use his powers and how to become a better hero, and even teams up with him to battle villains Kanjar Ro and Sportsmaster.

Curious about his origin, Reyes finds Ted Kord's old lair in "Fall of the Blue Beetle!", and uses the Bug airship to travel to Science Island where he is manipulated by Jarvis (pretending to be Ted). Batman and Blue Beetle stop Jarvis's plan.

Blue Beetle joins the other heroes in hunting down Batman in "Game Over for Owlman!", when Owlman disguises himself as Batman to commit crimes. He is captured by Owlman and trapped in an electrified cell. He is freed by a massive, muscular Batman and helps defeat Gorilla Grodd.

In "Night of the Huntress!", he develops a burgeoning crush on The Huntress.

In "Revenge of the Reach!", he begins to become a mind slave to the Reach, an alien race that uses scarabs like Jaime's to turn aliens into super powered beings until the scarabs take control of their minds for a full-fledged Reach invasion. Jaime defeats the Reach and regains his mind with the help of Batman, the Green Lantern Corps, and his own willpower.

He appears in "Aquaman's Outrageous Adventure!" as one of the heroes Aquaman helps on his family vacation. The King of Atlantis helps him defeat the Planet Master in a gold mine robbery in El Paso.

He appears after in the episodes "The Power of Shazam!", "The Siege of Starro! Part One" and "The Siege of Starro! Part Two", where he appears as a hero controlled by Starro.

He appears in the teaser segment in "Cry Freedom Fighters!", where he helps Stargirl defeat Mantis.

Blue Beetle later appears in "Darkseid Descending!", where he is recruited by Batman for the new Justice League.

Booster Gold
 Voiced by Tom Everett Scott

A museum security guard from 400 years in the future who uses technology to fight crime in Batman's time. Booster aspires to be a famous hero, but has an ego problem. He first appears in "Menace of the Conqueror Caveman!", he comes back from the future to stop Kru'll the Eternal, and teams up with Batman believing this will increase his chances of having his own franchise. However, after Kru'll kidnaps Skeets, he sacrifices his glory to save his only friend, and Booster ends up earning Batman's respect. In "A Bat Divided!" Booster Gold and Skeets are on a game show trying to save Batman, and Booster gets all the answers to the riddles wrong, harming Batman. Batman eventually frees himself and the two fight Riddler and his henchmen. Later, he appeared in "The Siege of Starro!" where he and Skeets team up with B'wana Beast, Firestorm, and Captain Marvel. They are the only one who have not been brainwashed by Starro. In "Menace of the Madniks!", it was revealed that Booster Gold was friends with Ted Kord before his death. He joins the Justice League International in "Darkseid Descending!".

Skeets
 Voiced by Billy West

Skeets is Booster Gold's robotic companion. He gets kidnapped by Kru'll the Eternal after Booster revealed what was powering him. Skeets later saves Booster from super-powered versions of Kru'll's henchmen by releasing his charge and reversing Kru'll's ray's effects. In "A Bat Divided!" he and Booster Gold are on a game show trying to save Batman. He joins the Justice League International in "Darkseid Descending!" alongside Booster Gold.

Bronze Tiger
 Voiced by Gary Anthony Sturgis

A martial artist and ally of Batman. He originally studied martial arts in Wong Fei's temple in China, alongside Bruce Wayne and Fox, Vulture, and Shark. He eventually left the school after his arrogant ways caused Wong Fei to lecture him. When the Terrible Trio and Shadow Clan murder Fei, Batman recruits Tiger to stop the clan. After defeating the Trio, Bronze Tiger decides to re-open the school, in honor of Wong Fei and to build an army if the Shadow Clan appears again. He first appears in "Return of the Fearsome Fangs!"

B'wana Beast
 Voiced by Kevin Michael Richardson

A superhero who can communicate with animals and merge two animals into one chimeric creature. He helps Batman in his fight with Black Manta. In his fight with him, B'wana Beast used his powers to merge a policeman's horse and a spider to form a creature to catch up with Black Manta and later merged a pelican and a shark to form a creature to stop Black Manta.

He appears again in "Gorillas in our Midst!", defending Gotham with Vixen while Batman is gone. He has shown he can merge more than two creatures as well, such as merging Batman with a lion, eagle and lizard to form a "Bat-Griffin". His latest appearance was the episode "The Siege of Starro! Part One", and the Faceless Hunter took interest in his unique powers and even kidnaps him at the end of the episode after Starro had fallen, intending to manipulate him into creating a clone. He dies stopping him.

Captain Atom
 Voiced by Brian Bloom

An arrogant, pompous, and egocentricial hero that is very smug of his power. He appears in "Powerless!" fighting one of his old enemies, Major Force, until he gets his powers drained from him but gets it back from defeating him.

Captain Marvel
 Voiced by Jeff Bennett (Captain Marvel), Tara Strong (Billy Batson)

A boy who can turn into an adult superhero named Captain Marvel by saying the magic word "SHAZAM". He appears in the teaser of "Death Race to Oblivion!" teaming up with Batman to stop Blockbuster at a museum. In "The Power of Shazam!", Billy teams up with Batman to stop Doctor Sivana and Black Adam. Billy also meets his long lost sister, Mary Bromfield. Billy/Marvel later helps Batman, B'wana Beast, Booster Gold and Firestorm in "The Siege of Starro! Part One" and teams up with the other members of the Marvel Family (Mary Marvel and Captain Marvel Jr.) in "The Malicious Mr. Mind!"

Mary Marvel
 Voiced by Tara Strong

The long-lost sister of Billy Batson. She first appeared in "The Power of Shazam!" where Batman managed to track Mary and her adoptive parents who end up adopting Billy. In "The Malicious Mister Mind!", Mary was seen to have become Mary Marvel.

Captain Marvel Jr.
 Voiced by John DeVito

A crippled newsboy who gained the powers similar to Captain Marvel from his friend Billy Batson. He appears in "The Malicious Mister Mind!" where he, Captain Marvel, and Mary Marvel help Batman fight the Monster Society of Evil.

Challengers of the Unknown
The Challengers of the Unknown are a group of adventurers who are "living on borrowed time". Consists of:

 "Prof" Haley (voiced by Armin Shimerman): The scientist leader of the Challengers.
 "Ace" Morgan (voiced by J.K. Simmons): Military test pilot.
 "Red" Ryan (voiced by Ioan Gruffudd): Expert mountaineer.
 "Rocky" Davis (voiced by James Arnold Taylor): Triathlete.

In the teaser to "Revenge of the Reach!", the Challengers travel to Dinosaur Island to investigate a radioactive meteorite, and Batman arrives to help them defeat a giant spider mutated by the meteorite. When Batman is called back to Gotham City, the meteorite hatches and a swarm of alien parasites attach themselves to them ending the teaser with a "To Be Continued..."

Cinnamon
A female bounty hunter in the Wild West. In "The Siege of Starro! Part One", she is featured in a teaser about heroes throughout history where she assists Jonah Hex into thwarting a bank robbery that was being committed by the western version of the Royal Flush Gang.

Creature Commandos
The Creature Commandos are a group of soldiers consisting of a human and some monsters. It consists of:

 Lt. Matthew Shrieve (voiced by Marc Worden) - A human who is the Creature Commandos' field commander.
 Dr. Myrrha Rhodes (voiced by Cathy Cavadini) - A woman who gained snake-like hair (similar to the Gorgons) after inhaling strange fumes.
 Pvt. Elliot "Lucky" Taylor (voiced by Dee Bradley Baker) - He resembles Frankenstein's Monster.
 Sgt. Vincent Velcro (voiced by Dee Bradley Baker) - A vampire.
 Warren Griffith (voiced by Dee Bradley Baker) - A werewolf.

They came to Dinosaur Island where some people have gone missing including Batman. They discover that the Ultra-Humanite is behind this and has been using mind-controlled dinosaurs.

Creeper
 Voiced by Brian Bloom

The insane but heroic alter-ego of talk show host Jack Ryder and one of Batman's fellow Gotham city defenders. He teams up with Batman in the teaser for "Time Out For Vengeance!", In which he cheers on and eventually helps Batman fight Hellgrammite. While initially annoyed at Ryder's antics, Batman eventually admits that he is indeed a valuable ally.

Deadman
 Voiced by Michael Rosenbaum

The ghost of Boston Brand, a trapeze artist in Haly's Circus who was shot and killed by an unknown man with a hook hand. Deadman's powers including the power to fly, phase through solid objects, and possess people. He wanders around the world, saying that he has not crossed over because he 'hasn't been invited' until he encounters Batman in London in the episode "Dawn of the Dead Man!". Batman mentioned that he had been investigating Boston Brand's death and trying to find the person responsible for causing it. Deadman uses his powers to help Batman, Green Arrow, and Speedy to stop Gentleman Ghost and his zombie army from destroying London, and is afterwards inspired to become a hero.

Detective Chimp
 Voiced by Kevin Michael Richardson

A super-intelligent chimpanzee and a Sherlock Holmes-type investigator. He teams up with Batman in the teaser to "The Golden Age of Justice!" to find who stole the golden skull, who in turn is revealed to be False-Face, who is quickly defeated by Batman and Detective Chimp. In "Gorillas in our Midst!", Detective Chimp helps Batman, B'wana Beast, and Vixen fight Gorilla Grodd's G.A.S.P. organization.

Doctor Fate
 Voiced by Greg Ellis

Kent Nelson uses his magic helmet to become the hero Doctor Fate. In "The Eyes of Despero!", he and Batman team up to stop the evil Wotan from breaking into the Library of Eternity. While a capable sorcerer, Doctor Fate has also taken boxing lessons from Batman in case his helmet is knocked off and puts these to good use against Wotan. He is the main guest star in the season one finale "The Fate of Equinox!", joining Batman to try to thwart the supernatural villain obsessed with balance. A younger version of Doctor Fate also appears in a small cameo role in "The Siege of Starro! Part One", battling Per Degaton alongside the JSA in the 1940s.

Doom Patrol
The Doom Patrol are a group of heroes.

The Chief (Dr. Niles Caulder)
 Voiced by Richard McGonagle

The paraplegic leader of the Doom Patrol. He rides in a state of the art hover chair with its own weapons.

Robotman
 Voiced by Henry Rollins

Following a terrible accident, the brain of Cliff Steele ended up in a robotic body creating Robotman.

Elasti-Girl
 Voiced by Olivia d'Abo

A size-shifting member of the Doom Patrol.

Negative Man
 Voiced by David K. Hill

A member of the Doom Patrol who can release a negatively charged energy being from his body.

Elongated Man
 Voiced by Sean Donnellan

Elongated Man is Ralph Dibny, a detective with the ability to stretch his body like rubber, and can even shapeshift into other people. Because of their similar powers, he has a rivalry with Plastic Man - saying that while he is more professional, the public apparently likes Plastic Man better. This is proven when the crime boss known as Baby Face cannot remember his name. In "Journey to the Center of the Bat!" Elongated Man and Plastic Man spend their time bickering as to whom Batman likes better while they try to fight Baby Face and his gang.

Enemy Ace
 Voiced by John DiMaggio

A German flying ace during the World Wars. In the opening teaser to "Aquaman's Outrageous Adventure!", he teams up with Batman to destroy an alien energy weapon being used by German forces. Despite fighting for the German side, Enemy Ace states that the alien fighting from a distance was 'not honorable'. After he and Batman destroy the weapon, he comments that he and the Dark Knight should fight in the sky once more.

Etrigan
 Voiced by Dee Bradley Baker

An immortal demon and ally to Batman, bound to the human Jason Blood. Etrigan works for Merlin in medieval times in Camelot, but Morgaine Le Fey hypnotizes him and uses him as her servant. Batman and Green Arrow fight Etrigan, and Merlin breaks his spell. He later helps them in defeating Le Fey. After Morgaine Le Fey was defeated, Etrigan left to fulfill his own destiny. Blood is later framed for crimes in 19th century England, caused by Gentleman Ghost, and asks Batman for help in clearing his name and stopping him and Astaroth in the underworld. He also makes a brief cameo in "Mayhem of the Music Meister!".

Fire
 Voiced by Grey DeLisle

A Brazilian superheroine with the ability to shoot mystical green fire, and ally to Batman. Fire helps Batman and Plastic Man when Gentleman Ghost robs a bank in Mexico City during the Day of the Dead celebration. An evil version of her is seen in "Deep Cover for Batman!", fighting a heroic version of the Gentleman Ghost. She is the only character with an evil counterpart not to appear in "Game Over for Owlman!" as one of the heroes. She later appears in the season one finale "The Fate of Equinox!". She makes a cameo in "Sidekicks Assemble!", and then later appeared in "The Siege of Starro!". A revamped Fire appeared in a starring role in "Darkseid Descending!" alongside Ice. Fire's later appearances see her as bubbly and slightly dim.

Firestorm
 Voiced by Bill Fagerbakke (Ronnie Raymond), Tyler James Williams (Jason Rusch)

Appears in season two episode "A Bat Divided!". Jason Rusch was a genius high school student with a liking for physics. His science teacher/gym coach Ronnie Raymond on the other hand was rather dimwitted and often annoyed Rusch. During a field trip in a nuclear plant, the villain Doctor Double X activates a nuclear reactor, resulting in the two being fused together and becoming Firestorm. They ask Batman for help, and he builds them a radiation containment suit. When the duo discover that the Batman that helped them was only a part of the hero also affected in the explosion, they work together to help him return to normal and defeat Double X. After the battle, they take the name "Firestorm". They later help Batman in "The Siege of Starro! Part One".

Flash
Each of the Flashes has super-speed.

Jay Garrick
 Voiced by Andy Milder

The first Flash and the mentor of the second (Barry Allen). He helps Batman thwart a Halloween plot by Scarecrow and Scream Queen to infect all of Gotham City with Fear Gas infused pumpkins. While Batman is fighting Scarecrow, Flash is attacked by Scream Queen, but manages to defeat her by shoving a fear gas infused pumpkin into her mouth, causing her to hallucinate. He then rounds up all the pumpkins and deposits them on Scarecrow's doorstep, which avalanche onto him when he tries to escape. When the people get angry at him for stealing their pumpkins and demanding an explanation, he looks to Batman for help only to find that he has disappeared. Jay is also a member of the Justice Society of America, and helped defeat Per Degaton. In "Requiem for a Scarlet Speedster!", Wally West blames Jay Garrick for the death of Barry Allen.

Barry Allen
 Voiced by Alan Tudyk

Barry Allen had a cameo appearance in "Sidekicks Assemble!". He also has a sidekick named Kid Flash. He is captured by Professor Zoom (in the 25th century) in "Requiem for a Scarlet Speedster!". Batman, Wally West (Kid Flash), and Jay Garrick travel to the 25th century to rescue him. After Professor Zoom is defeated, Batman and the three Flashes return to the present where they end up fighting the Rogues.

Kid Flash
 Voiced by Hunter Parrish

The sidekick of Barry who appears in "Requiem for a Scarlet Speedster!". Wally blames Jay Garrick (and himself) for Barry Allen's death. He showed up to help Jay Garrick fend off the Rogues. He later helps them in rescuing Barry Allen from Professor Zoom in the future.  Despite not being featured with his Teen Titans co-members Robin, Speedy, and Aqualad, in the team's debut episode, he does state in his appearance that he is indeed friends with Nightwing, telling Batman to say hi to him for him.

Freedom Fighters
The Freedom Fighters are an All-American crime fighting team of superheroes that appear in "Cry Freedom Fighters!".

Uncle Sam
 Voiced by Peter Reneday

A patriotic-themed American superhero, the embodiment of patriotism, and the leader of the Freedom Fighters that appears in "Cry Freedom Fighters!". If he's somewhere without patriotism for too long, he will fade out of existence, leaving only his hat behind until the feeling is there to revive him. He can give power to others, giving them a patriotic theme to their costumes.

Black Condor
 Voiced by Jason C. Miller

Black Condor is a superhero who can fly.

Doll Man
 Voiced by Jason C. Miller

A superhero that is the size of a doll, but has full human strength.

Human Bomb
A superhero that can trigger explosions from his body or elsewhere.

Phantom Lady
 Voiced by Hope Levy

A superhero uses technology to provide the powers of intangibility, invisibility, and self-duplication. Plastic Man developed a crush on her.

Ray
 Voiced by Tom Kenny

A superhero who can absorb, store, and process pure light and use the energy to fly and create dazzlingly strong and powerful bursts of light.

Green Arrow
 Voiced by James Arnold Taylor

The world's greatest archer, and close friend of Batman. Like Batman, Green Arrow is wealthy, has themed gadgets and vehicles, which has him in a friendly rivalry against him. Green Arrow and Batman both battle the Clock King together, and both help Merlin and Etrigan fight Morgaine Le Fey in Camelot.

He and Speedy later help the astral projection form of Batman dig out his body and fight Gentleman Ghost's army. He joins the other heroes in hunting Batman, when Owlman disguises himself as Batman. He is captured by Owlman and nearly killed by a giant crossbow but is rescued by a vampire-like Batman and helps defeat Gentleman Ghost.

In "Legends of the Dark Mite!" Green Arrow is fighting Copperhead when Bat-Mite comes and tells him that he is his favorite super hero.

Green Arrow teams up with Batman in "Inside the Outsiders!". They are fighting Catwoman, who has them in a trap planning to feed them to a lion, tiger, and panther. To Green Arrow's disgust, Batman and Catwoman start flirting with each other in their own special ways; when they escape and try to apprehend her, Catwoman escapes seemingly because of Batman, and Green Arrow calls him on it. Batman calls him when Joker robs a bank in "Hail the Tornado Tyrant!"

In "Mayhem of the Music Meister!" he is one of three superheroes stopping the theft of a satellite by super villains and is compelled by the title villain through hypnotic songs to obey the Meister's commands. At the end of the episode, he declares his love for and wins the affection of Black Canary.

In "Aquaman's Outrageous Adventure!" Aquaman, on a family vacation, helps him defeat Clock King after a robbery of the Star City Bank.

He later appears in "Sidekicks Assemble!" alongside Batman and Aquaman, as they try to keep their sidekicks out of the way in their quest to stop Ra's al Ghul. They end up picking up after the sidekicks as they manage to save the city and prove they are just as good heroes as Batman, Aquaman, and Green Arrow.

He later helps Batman fight in outer space against intergalactic bandits in "The Super-Batman of Planet X!" He loses Batman when a wormhole opens and sucks Batman in, forcing him to fight alone for the rest of the episode. He eventually finds Batman on the planet Zurr-En-Arrh, where he gains superpowers, much to his delight, only to lose them when sprayed by the Batman of Zurr-En-Arrh.
In "The Power of Shazam!", he is attacked by the Faceless Hunter and a mind-controlled Speedy who latches a Starro onto him, forcing him under his mind control. He later fights Batman, Booster Gold and Skeets, Captain Marvel, Firestorm the Nuclear Man, and B'wana Beast alongside the rest of Earth's brainwashed heroes. He appears later at B'wana Beast's funeral, helping to console his widowed fiancé Vixen.

Speedy
 Voiced by Jason Marsden (adult), Ryan Ochoa (young)

Green Arrow's sidekick is named Speedy. His real name is Roy Harper. Always cheery and sweet, Speedy helps him fight crime, and has been possessed by both Deadman and Batman. Speedy was mentioned in "Color of Revenge!" while Batman was lecturing Robin. Speedy appears again in "Sidekicks Assemble!" where he along with Robin and Aqualad team-up to battle Ra's Al Ghul in the hopes of showing their respective mentors that they deserve proper respect as heroes. He later attacks Green Arrow after being brainwashed by the Faceless Hunter and subsequently appears among the brainwashed heroes fighting Batman, Booster Gold and Skeets, Captain Marvel, Firestorm, and B'wana Beast.

The Green Lantern Corps
An organization of intergalactic police, and each member is given a power ring and is assigned a sector of the galaxies. Among the hundreds of members include:

Arisia Rrab
 Voiced by Grey DeLisle (Video Game)

An orange-skinned female Lantern with blond hair and pointed ears.

Ch'p
A Green Lantern who resembles a squirrel.

Chaselon
A crystalline Green Lantern.

G'nort
 Voiced by Alexander Polinsky

He, Sinestro, and Guy Gardner call upon Batman to space to help track down many Green Lanterns who are missing in action after a battle with Despero. He later proves vital for helping Batman stop the brainwashed Mogo. After Batman compliments him twice and helps G'nort earn the respect of the Corp, he jumps into his arms to lick him, only to be reprimanded for doing so. It is also shown that he cannot fully memorize the Green Lantern motto and was only able to do so by reading it from a "cheat sheet" on his left wrist.

Galius Zed
A round Green Lantern with three legs.

Guy Gardner
 Voiced by James Arnold Taylor

A hot-headed member of the Green Lantern Corps, and the third human to earn a Green Lantern ring. His antics caused a K'Vellian prisoner to go on a path of destructive rage, but thanks to Batman, the prisoner was stopped and he has Guy clean up the mess it made. He reappears in "The Eyes of Despero!" to help Batman overthrow dictator Despero. At first, he is extremely rude to Batman, constantly degrading him, but the last straw comes when he refuses to listen to Batman's plan; the Dark Knight punches him unconscious, and Gardner grudgingly gives his respect. He, Sinestro, and G'nort create a Batarmor for the job upon him requesting that he come. When he sees Sinestro attempting to blow up a rogue Mogo; they do battle, with Guy winning. Guy imprisoned Sinestro in his ring at the end of the episode. In fact, in this same episode he proves to have a much stronger conscience than he originally appeared to have. He also makes a brief cameo in "Mayhem of the Music Meister!". In "Death Race to Oblivion!", it is revealed that Guy has a fear of clowns when the Joker runs him off the road in a Mongul-sanctioned race for Earth's survival. In "Revenge of the Reach!" Guy Gardener is one of the Green Lanterns who try to get the "suit" off of Blue Beetle's back. He does not like the Blue Beetle in the beginning, but at the end they become friends. He is later seen fighting against the Starro invasion of Oa alongside Kilowog, Ultra the Multi-Alien, Captain Comet and Space Ranger before succumbing to the Star Conqueror.

Hal Jordan
 Voiced by Loren Lester

The second human to earn a Green Lantern ring (the first being Alan Scott). He is first seen leading many other Green Lanterns into battle against Despero, only to have them be turned against him by Despero's mind control. Releasing a discharge of power from his ring, he seemingly perished in the blast alongside his fellow Lanterns, with his ring going across the universe in search of another wielder. It makes its way to Batman, sending him into space. Hal, the missing in action Lanterns, and the Guardians of the Universe were revealed to be alive and in the ring near the end. He makes a cameo appearance in "Aquaman's Outrageous Adventure!" defeating Dr. Polaris after he tries to steal some cars outside of a Museum of Minerals. In "Sidekicks Assemble!" Hal Jordan is shown as a member of the Justice League.

Hal was given his first full episode in "Scorn of the Star Sapphire!" when his girlfriend Carol Ferris was turned into Star Sapphire by the Zamarons.

Katma Tui
A red-skinned Green Lantern with brunette hair.

Kilowog
 Voiced by Diedrich Bader

In "Day of the Dark Knight!", he was taking in a K'Vellian prisoner when Guy's antics caused that prisoner to go into rage. Thanks to him and Batman, the K'Vellian prisoner was caught. In "The Eyes of Despero!", he was in Hal Jordan's army when he was brainwashed by Despero. He was later revealed to be alive and was in Hal's Power Ring. In "Revenge of the Reach!", Kilowog is one of the many Green Lanterns who are fighting the Reach.

Larvox
An oval-shaped Green Lantern with four tentacles for arms.

Medphyll
A plant-like Green Lantern.

Mogo
A living planet and Green Lantern member. Despero takes control of Mogo as part of his plan, giving Mogo the ability to hypnotize entire planets at a time. It is later freed by G'nort.

Stel
A robotic Green Lantern.

Salaak
A pink-skinned Lantern with 4 arms.

Tomar-Re
An orange-skinned Green Lantern with a beak and head fin.

Guardians of the Universe
 Voiced by J. K. Simmons and Armin Shimerman

The Guardians of the Universe are a race of extraterrestrial beings that created the Green Lantern Corps. In "The Eyes of Despero!", they made a cameo appearance amongst the Green Lanterns who were inside Hal Jordan's ring. In "Revenge of the Reach!", the Guardians of the Universe explain to Batman and Blue Beetle on how Blue Beetle's scarab is connected to the Reach.

Hawk and Dove
 Voiced by Greg Ellis (Hawk), Dee Bradley Baker (Dove)

Hawk and Dove are brothers who received their superpowers from each representative of the Lords of Chaos and Order. They tend to bicker a lot when it comes to combating crime. Batman brought them along to help settle an intergalactic war.

Haunted Tank
 Voiced by Dee Bradley Baker

An ordinary tank possessed by the ghost of Confederate general J.E.B. Stuart. In the teaser of "Menace of the Madniks!", he helps Batman in taking down Ma Murder and her gang.

Huntress
 Voiced by Tara Strong

A masked vigilante, and ally of Batman. Her real name is Helena Bertinelli. She first appears in "Night of the Huntress!", where she helps Batman and Blue Beetle battle Baby Face. In this episode, Blue Beetle has a crush on her. She later appeared racing for control of the world in "Death Race to Oblivion!", faking her death to stop Mongul. She is later among the many brainwashed superheroes being controlled by Starro during his invasion.

Ice
 Voiced by Jennifer Hale

The airheaded Norwegian partner of Fire in "Darkseid Descending!". In the episode "Shadow of the Bat!", it is revealed that she has a crush on Aquaman. Her absent-mindedness is best shown when Fire mentions that Aquaman is married, but Ice is apparently unaware of this and instead believes him to be overly preoccupied with (married to) his work.

Jonah Hex
 Voiced by Phil Morris

A disfigured mercenary and ally of Batman. A hero of the Wild West, he is captured and tied by the Royal Flush Gang after he tried to stop them. However, a time-warped Batman saves him, and the two capture the gang. Hex is grateful of Batman's help, but mocks his costume.

In "Duel of the Double Crossers!", Mongul brings Jonah Hex to the present and would return him to the past in exchange that he brings Batman to War World. Eventually, Batman and Hex team up to fight Mongul. The time machine is destroyed, but Hex decides to stay in the present alongside Lashina.

Justice League
The successor to the Golden Age Justice Society of America and make their first official appearance as a group in "Sidekicks Assemble!". Includes Aquaman, Batman, Black Canary, Fire, The Flash, Green Arrow, Green Lantern (Hal Jordan), Martian Manhunter, Red Tornado, Plastic Man, Superman and Wonder Woman. Aqualad, Robin and Speedy are also shown as junior members. In "Cry Freedom Fighters!", Plastic Man mentioned that he was kicked out of the League, but exactly why goes unexplained.

Justice League International
The Justice League International is featured in "Darkseid Descending!", and consists of Batman, Aquaman, Martian Manhunter, Green Lantern (Guy Gardner), Booster Gold, Blue Beetle (Jaime Reyes), Fire, and Ice. It is mentioned by Aquaman that there had been a previous incarnation of the JLA, but it disbanded under unpleasant circumstances.

The Justice League International was first formed in "Darkseid Descending!" when it came to the invasion of Darkseid.

Justice Society of America
The Justice Society is a group of superheroes that existed since the Golden Age. They are the first group of superheroes to be formed and it is revealed that they tutored Batman during his early superhero days. In the present day, Batman helps them when an old foe Per Degaton comes out of stasis in "The Golden Age of Justice!". Includes the first Flash (Jay Garrick), first Black Canary, Wildcat, Dr. Mid-Nite, Hawkman, and Hourman. They appear in the opening teaser to "The Siege of Starro! Part One" where they fight Per Degaton's forces in Washington, D.C. in the Golden Age of Heroes. It is also revealed that Doctor Fate was a member at one time, with a different appearance than in the present day. They then appear as brainwashed minions of the Starro invasion fighting against Batman, B'wana Beast, Captain Marvel, Booster Gold and Skeets, and Firestorm. In the episode "Crisis: 22,300 Miles Above Earth!" the Justice League International host a party on the Watchtower for themselves and the Justice Society of America, with Spectre, Doctor Fate, the first Flash, Wildcat, Mr. Terrific, Sandman, Starman, and the first Green Lantern now shown as members. They arrive at the Justice League Satellite to have a party with the Justice League International, but end up fighting their youth counterparts. Both teams end up working together to combat Ra's al Ghul. Additionally, Stargirl appears in the episode "Cry Freedom Fighters!" where she teams up with Blue Beetle.

Alan Scott
 Voiced by Corey Burton

The Golden Age Green Lantern whose ring is the same as the Green Lantern Corps' rings, but cannot work on wood.

Doctor Mid-Nite
 Voiced by Corey Burton

A blind doctor turned superhero who wears special visors to help him see.

Hawkman
 Voiced by William Katt

A hawk-themed superhero with an Nth Metal belt and mace.

Hourman
 Voiced by Lex Lang

A scientific superhero that uses an hourglass-shaped device to increase his strength for 1 hour.

Mister Terrific

Sandman
A hero who uses knock-out gas to put his enemies to sleep.

Starman
 Voiced by Jeff Bennett

A hero whose abilities comes from his inventions, the gravity rod and the cosmic rod. These devices channel an unknown form of stellar radiation, which Starman is able to manipulate through the rod. As Starman, he possesses the ability to fly, project bursts of stellar energy, light, and heat, create force fields and simple energy constructs, and levitate objects.

Kamandi
 Voiced by Mikey Kelley

A hero from a post-apocalyptic future where animals have evolved into sentient beings. Kamandi and Dr. Canus help Batman escape from the ratmen that inhabit New York City. Dr. Canus helped Batman find bacteria for a vaccine that Batman needed to save Gotham City, and Kamandi helps Batman return to his time by locating the time portal he came through. Batman does not want to leave Kamandi and Canus to the mercy of the ratmen, and instead leaves a time-capsule in the Statue of Liberty's left nostril that contained a superweapon to fight off the ratmen. Kamandi and Dr. Canus later appear in "Last Bat on Earth!" helping Batman find and defeat Gorilla Grodd, who has traveled to their future. Kamandi and Dr. Canus come to the present, briefly, in "The Malicious Mr. Mind!".

Dr. Canus
 Voiced by Greg Ellis

A highly evolved dog that is Kamandi's companion.

Prince Tuftan
 Voiced by Yuri Lowenthal

A highly evolved tiger who is the son of Great Caesar of the Tiger People and a friend of Kamandi.

The Man-Bat Tribe
A group of highly evolved bats that live in the Batcave in the post-apocalyptic future. In "Last Bat on Earth!", they attack Batman, Kamandi, and Dr. Canus for invading their home, but were defeated and forced to retreat. They return later during the final battle with Gorilla Grodd's army, but on the side of Batman and his allies, having gained respect for him.

Martian Manhunter
 Voiced by Nicholas Guest

A Green Martian who is the last of his kind after his people were slaughtered by the White Martians. In "Sidekicks Assemble!", he made a cameo amongst the Justice League when they were discussing how to stop a meteor from hitting Earth. He appears after in the episode "Darkseid Descending!" as a member of Justice League International.

Metal Men
The Metal Men are a team of robots created by Dr. Milton "Doc" Magnus. After his colleagues were killed in an accident, Doc continued with his research, eventually creating the Metal Men "The Next Generation in Crime Fighting". The Metal Men first appeared in "Clash of the Metal Men!", helping Batman take down Chemo, and later rescue their creator from the Gas Gang. All of them possess liquid shape-shifting powers, but also have differing powers based on their periodic composition. In the teaser to "The Super-Batman of Planet X!", Doc Magnus disguises himself as a criminal (with the Metal Men as different costume pieces) to help Batman defeat Kanjar Ro and his space pirates. They later appear in the second part of "The Siege of Starro!" as Batman's secret weapon against the giant composite Starro monster. They transform into the giant composite warrior Alloy and help defeat the composite Starro.

 Gold (voiced by Lex Lang) - The team leader.
 Platinum (voiced by Hynden Walch) - The female member of the team. She was seen flirting with Batman. She is also called Tina
 Mercury (voiced by Corey Burton) - The hothead of the group. He can solidify his liquid-metal form to trap his enemies and ignite.
 Iron (voiced by Brian Bloom) - The physically strongest member of the team. He has to be careful around water and high concentrations of oxygen or he'll rust.
 Lead (voiced by Bill Fagerbakke) - The team simpleton/strong man. His lead body can protect people from energy and radiation.
 Tin (voiced by Dee Bradley Baker) - Initially the least confident Metal Man, he finally gains some self-respect after saving Doc Magnus from the maw of a volcano.

Mister Miracle
 Voiced by Yuri Lowenthal

Mister Miracle is a superhero and the universe's greatest escape artist. He and Batman teamed up to put on an escape stunt to raise money for an orphan fund. After the event while Batman gives out autographs to fans, Barda complains about Mister Miracle not helping around the house. Batman remarks that no matter how good Mister Miracle is at escaping, he will not be able to get out of a wife's demands.

Big Barda
 Voiced by Diane Delano

Mister Miracle's wife, who helped her husband and Batman put on an escape stunt to raise money for an orphan fund. After the event when Mister Miracle is bragging about his escape, Barda replies, "You know what would be a real miracle? If you would finally clean out the garage". As she walks away, Batman quips, "Guess that's one trap you can't escape from".

OMAC
 Voiced by Jeff Bennett

An operation done on janitor Buddy Blank resulted in turning him into the One-Man Army Corps, simply known as OMAC. An agent of the Global Peace Agency (or GPA for short), he is given aid by Batman in his mission to stop General Kafka, later he takes on Shrapnel. OMAC and Buddy Blank are separate personalities, Buddy was not aware of OMAC until Batman told him his purpose. While OMAC handles Shrapnel, Batman interrogates and fights Equinox, the person. Shrapnel is eventually brought to justice by OMAC, and previously clumsy Buddy buys time for Batman to stop a nuclear meltdown by distracting Equinox after reverting from his OMAC form.

The Outsiders
The Outsiders are a group of teenage superheroes, and are allies to Batman and Wildcat. They consist of leader Black Lightning, the silent Katana, and the goofball Metamorpho. They started out as a gang of teenage criminals that were manipulated by Slug. After Wildcat took down Slug in a boxing match, he and Batman convince them to battle Slug and use their powers for good. After that, they receive boxing training and guidance from Wildcat. In "Duel of the Double Crossers!", Batman trains the Outsiders by using a simulation of Despero attacking the city. Their most recent appearance has them being attacked by the Psycho-Pirate, with Batman coming to their aid. In a teaser for "Requiem for a Scarlet Speedster!" they once again team up with Batman to stop Kobra and his cultists.

Black Lightning
 Voiced by Bumper Robinson

The apparent leader of the trio, leading them on an attack of a shopping center. His real name is Jefferson Pierce, and has the power to manipulate electricity, firing it in bolts as well as concentrating it into explosive balls of lightning. His outfit is a blue hoodie with yellow lightning bolts on it, and black cargo pants. Though somewhat confused and angry at the world, Black Lightning does not give the appearance of being evil. After Batman and Wildcat infiltrate their underground headquarters and defeat their monstrous leader, Slug, Black Lightning uses his electricity to save Wildcat's life, with instruction from Katana, to jumpstart the elder's heart when he suffers a cardiac arrest. He is seen at the end of the episode boxing with Wildcat. In the teaser for "Duel of the Double Crossers!", he reveals that he has an afro-style haircut underneath his hood. In the episode "Inside the Outsiders!", when Batman entered Black Lightning's mind to stop Psycho-Pirate from feeding off his rage, it is revealed that Lightning is easily enraged by even the most inane and inconsequential things, like someone putting sprinkles in his coffee. In the cold open to "Requiem for a Scarlet Speedster!" he and the Outsiders defeat Kobra. He has a new costume (along with Katana) in the episode.

Katana
 Voiced by Vyvan Pham (in "Enter the Outsiders!"), Kim Mai Guest (in "Inside the Outsiders!")

The lone female in the Outsider's trio, she has no super powers, but is a highly skilled martial artist and swordswoman. Her real name is Tatsu Yamashiro. Katana is generally silent, typically letting her actions speak for her. After Batman and Wildcat convince her and the Outsiders to turn against their monstrous boss Slug, Wildcat suffers from a heart attack causing Katana to take charge of the situation and speak. She instructs Black Lightning to jumpstart Wildcats heart while Metamorpho becomes oxygen to fill his lungs to revive him. She is later seen at Wildcat's gym dumping one of his "Tiger Tonics" into a nearby house plant. In "Inside the Outsiders!", Katana and the rest of the Outsiders are captured by Psycho Pirate, and her dream is re-living the night her master is killed, only modified to make it look like it was her fault, and is silent because she talked too much. Psycho Pirate (disguised as Takeo) taunts her, even encouraging her to kill him, using her rage to power himself, though Batman is able to remind her that her silence is a way to honor Takahiro's teachings of self-control. In "The Siege of Starro! Part One", she wore a samurai costume, while in "Requiem for a Scarlet Speedster!", she is seen in the classic costume her adult version wears, and she and the rest of the Outsiders stop Kobra.

Metamorpho
 Voiced by Scott Menville

Metamorpho has the ability to change his body into any shape, as well as transforming into any member of the periodic table of elements. His real name is Rex Mason. Metamorpho helps in saving Wildcat's life when his heart stops in the middle of a fight by turning his body into oxygen to get into Wildcat's lungs. His unique abilities apparently require much energy, as he is seen almost constantly eating during the show. At the end of the episode he is seen at Wildcat's gym heartily drinking down Wildcat's Tiger Tonic. In "Inside the Outsiders!", Psycho Pirate captures the Outsiders and makes them live their nightmares. Metamorpho's nightmare is destroying a city, due to anger regarding insecurities of his appearance. In "Requiem for a Scarlet Speedster!" Metamorpho and the Outsiders help Batman stop Kobra.

Geo-Force
 Voiced by Hunter Parrish

A super hero who has the power to manipulate the earth. In "Requiem for a Scarlet Speedster!", he is a new member of the Outsiders (along with Halo), and helps Batman stop Kobra.

Halo
A super heroine who can make a barrier to protect herself and her friends and can shoot energy beams from her hands. In "Requiem for a Scarlet Speedster!" Halo is a new member of the Outsiders (along with Geo-force), and helps Batman stop Kobra.

Parallel Earth Heroes
The villains' counterparts in the alternate reality are the good guys and often oppose the Injustice Syndicate. They are part of Red Hood's group. The good guys from this Earth are:

 Red Hood (voiced by Jeff Bennett) - The Red Hood of this world is a disfigured masked hero, and ally of Batman. This Red Hood is the heroic version of the Joker, who was knocked into a chemical vat by Owlman and Scarlet Scarab, but continued fighting crime as the Red Hood. In Batman's world the original Red Hood became the villain Joker.
 Parallel Earth Black Manta - A heroic version of Black Manta who has the color scheme of Aquaman.
 Parallel Earth Brain - A heroic version of the Brain who was only seen in a flashback when Silver Cyclone was interrogating Red Hood.
 Parallel Earth Clock King - A heroic version of the Clock King.
 Parallel Earth Doctor Polaris - A heroic version of Doctor Polaris.
 Parallel Earth Gentleman Ghost - A heroic version of the Gentleman Ghost who wears black, and shoots green flame.
 Parallel Earth Gorilla Grodd - A heroic version of Gorilla Grodd who is white and brown. Batman almost punches the counterpart, but stops short and explains "You look like someone I know".
 Parallel Earth Kite Man - A heroic version of Kite Man who was only seen in a flashback when Silver Cyclone was interrogating Red Hood.
 Parallel Earth Sinestro- A heroic version of Sinestro who uses the Yellow Power Ring, yet the symbol on his yellow uniform appears to be that of the Green Lantern Corps in the comics.

Phantom Stranger
 Voiced by Kevin Conroy

The Phantom Stranger appears in "Chill of the Night!". He represents justice while the Spectre is the spirit of vengeance.

In "Chill of the Night!", he and the Spectre make a wager on Batman's soul.

Plastic Man
 Voiced by Tom Kenny

A light-hearted, naive, clumsy elastic hero, and friend of Batman. Edward "Eel" O'Brian was the henchman of the villain Kite Man, and went on a heist with him at a chemical plant. When Batman stopped Kite Man, he accidentally pushed O'Brian into a vat of chemicals that changed his body chemistry, giving him elastic powers. After Batman stayed with him for recovery in the hospital, he began to reform by testifying against Kite Man. After Batman helped him get parole, he became Plastic Man, and has tried to redeem himself by being a hero. However, he still has urges to steal money whenever he has the chance. Plastic Man and Batman team up to fight Gentleman Ghost and Gorilla Grodd. Batman is doubtful of Plastic Man's redemption and his criminal urges but grows to trust him after Plastic Man lobs the gold he stole at Grodd to save him.

Plastic Man and Elongated Man later team up to fight Baby Face, while arguing who Batman likes better, an argument that gets them tangled up together.

He joins the other heroes in hunting down Batman when Owlman, disguised as him, frames him. Despite the fact that the other heroes do not really want his help, he comes closer to actually catching Batman than anyone else. He later helps a psychic-Batman from an alternate universe stop the Brain by distracting him. Plastic Man is portrayed as a mostly ineffectual character in the series, and has a mixed relationship with Batman; although Batman is annoyed by the awkward behavior of O'Brian, they are shown to be good friends and Batman often helps and advises "Plas" concerning his mistakes.

He is married to a woman called Ramona, who appears to be rather unsupportive and cynical of his pursuit of justice. They also have a baby son.

Woozy Winks
 Voiced by Stephen Root

A short, stout man who is Plastic Man's sidekick, despite not having any superpowers himself. He appears in "Death Race to Oblivion!" riding Plastic Man (in his car form). Winks develops a crush on Catwoman, and helps the other heroes escape from Mongul's prison. In "Long Arm of the Law!", he helps Batman and Plastic Man rescue Plastic Man's wife and son from Kite Man. Despite being clumsy, it comes in handy during the Batman's fight against Kite Man (an example being Batman has to avoid Woozy from bumping into him, thus making Batman avoid any attacks from Kite Man's petrification machine)

The Question
 Voiced by Nicholas Guest (series), Jeffrey Combs (Scooby-Doo! & Batman: The Brave and the Bold)

A mysterious figure who wears a mask that makes him appear faceless. The Question appears in the teaser of the episode "Mystery in Space!". He is caught by Equinox with Gorilla Grodd. Batman saves him and Grodd. The Question later appears in "The Knights of Tomorrow!", where he infiltrates Darkseid's castle on the planet Apokolips to discover the New God of Evil's plans for Earth's conquest. Question demonstrates exceptional martial art skills to defeat the Parademons, but apparently commits suicide to avoid being captured by Kalibak. In the following episode, "Darkseid Descending!", it is revealed that he faked his suicide to go undercover as a Parademon. He manipulates the boom tubes to pull back the Apokolips army, and save Batman and the Justice League International from Darkseid. The Question here makes frequent use of questions in his dialogue.

Red Tornado
 Voiced by Corey Burton

He lives in a suburban neighborhood in his civilian identity as "John Ulthoon", a college professor of archaeology. He is an android but wishes to understand mankind and feel what they're able to. He can project tornadoes from his arms and legs, having great control over them, also being a robot, he can be destroyed and rebuilt if need be. In the episode "Invasion of the Secret Santas!", Red Tornado tries to understand the spirit of Christmas, while helping Batman stop Fun Haus's holiday crime spree. Red Tornado destroys Fun Haus's giant robot and defeats the villain, but his body is destroyed due to an overload. However, shortly before exploding, he finally experiences the "tingling sensation" that he believes to be Christmas Spirit. His pieces are picked up by hazmat scientists and taken to be rebuilt at S.T.A.R. Labs. He appears in "Game Over for Owlman!". When Owlman framed Batman by posing as him, Red Tornado was among those hunting Batman but is caught in a trap set by Owlman. Owlman tries to kill him by having him pulled to pieces by a magnetic field but is saved by a Zorro-like Batman and helps defeat Clock King. He eventually becomes lonely in "Hail to the Tornado Tyrant!" and thus builds himself a son named Tornado Champion. Red Tornado adds human emotions to him, but, due to interference by the villain Major Disaster. Champion goes insane and wants to wipe out mankind. Renaming himself Tornado Tyrant. Batman and Red Tornado battle with Tyrant, Red Tornado seeking to reason with his son but suffering severe damage in the process. In the end, Red Tornado is begrudgingly forced to destroy his own son by driving his hands into Tyrant's chest and blasting with his powers. Despite the fact that he claims to have no human emotion, the ending of the episode sees him shed a tear at the loss of his son, though it seems Red Tornado does not understand what this means (he stated that it was 'oily discharge'). This episode also shows he considers Batman a close friend, so close that he wanted him to witness the creation of his son. He makes a cameo appearance in "Aquaman's Outrageous Adventure!" defeating the Top in Smallville. In "Sidekicks Assemble!" he is shown as a member of the Justice League. In "The Power of Shazam!", he was killed by the Faceless Hunter, since he is immune to Starro's mind control.

Space Ghost
 Voiced by Gary Owens

A superhero whose sidekicks are Jan, Jace, and Blip. Space Ghost uses his Power Bands and Inviso-Belt in fighting crime in the galaxy. He teams up with Batman in "Bold Beginnings!" to stop one of their old enemies, the Creature King.

Space Ranger
Space Ranger appeared in "The Siege of Starro! Part One" fighting Starro with the Green Lantern Corps.

Spectre
 Voiced by Mark Hamill

The Spirit of Vengeance. In "Chill of the Night!", He and Phantom Stranger observe Batman as his origins are revealed. As the Stranger attempts to keep Batman's rage in check, the Spectre attempts to lure him over to the path of merciless vengeance. In the end, he is unsuccessful in convincing Batman to take the life of Joe Chill, the man who murdered his parents, but manipulates events and kills Chill personally.

Spectre reappears in the teaser of "Gorillas in our Midst!" where he teams up with Batman to foil Professor Milo. Batman defeats Professor Milo, tells Spectre to let the police deal with him, and they both leave. Spectre later returns and transforms Professor Milo into cheese so his surgically-altered lab rats could eat him.

In "Crisis: 22,300 Miles Above Earth!", Spectre is seen as a member of the Justice Society.

Stargirl
 Voiced by Hope Levy

Stargirl appears in the teaser segment of the episode "Cry Freedom Fighters!", where she fights Mantis. When she uses her staff to create her own Bat-Signal to call Batman, she ends up getting Blue Beetle. It took the combined abilities of both their attacks to defeat Mantis.

Superman
 Voiced by Roger Rose

Superman is a powerhouse from the planet Krypton, who happens to be the last of his kind. He was referenced in "Legends of the Dark Mite!" when Batman told Bat-Mite that Superman told him about Mr. Mxyzptlk and mentioned by Booster Gold by his nickname, Big Blue. Aside from that, after reverting to his original form after going through dinosaur poo in the form of a spade, Plastic Man asked why Superman did not have to go through this. He is shown in "Sidekicks Assemble!" along with the other Justice League members, although his face is not shown. His identity of Clark Kent shows up in Bruce Wayne's wedding and funeral in "The Knights of Tomorrow!". He finally appears in "Battle of the Superheroes!" where Superman is exposed to Red Kryptonite and turns evil causing Batman and Krypto to fight Superman until the effects of the Red Kryptonite wear off. In the end of the episode Superman, Batman, Lois Lane and Jimmy Olsen figure out Lex Luthor exposed him to the Red Kryptonite. Batman and Superman managed to defeat Lex Luthor and take him to jail. When Brainiac attacks Metropolis, Superman and Batman spring into action.

Krypto
Krypto is Superman's dog who has the same powers as Superman.

Ultra the Multi-Alien
Ultra is a fusion between four alien species and a human named Ace Arn. He appeared in "The Siege of Starro! Part One" fighting Starro with the Green Lantern Corps.

Vigilante
 Voiced by John DiMaggio

A western themed superhero that brings justice to the Old West. He appears in the teaser of "Night of the Batmen!"

Vixen
 Voiced by Cree Summer

A superhero who can mimic the abilities of any animals. She fights Gorilla Grodd and his G.A.S.P. with Batman, Detective Chimp and B'wana Beast in "Gorillas in our Midst!".

Wildcat
 Voiced by R. Lee Ermey (adult), Lex Lang (young)

A crime fighter from a bygone era who originally taught Batman how to box, as seen sparring with Batman at the start of the episode. Wildcat (real name: Ted Grant) is a gruff and feisty crime fighter who is slightly depressed that no one wants to come and learn boxing from him nowadays. He helps Batman in his fight against the Outsiders when they attack a shopping mall, and are apparently working for a gross mutant named Slug. They later find Slug's hideout, but ended up captured and are about to be fed to his giant mutant snapper turtles. Due to trash talking, Slug released Wildcat, but left Batman for the giant turtles in a deep pit. Wildcat fought against Slug while Batman escaped the pit. Wildcat defeated him and threw him in the toxic waste-filled river, which mutated him into an even larger, tentacled freak. Wildcat managed to convince the Outsiders not to consider themselves freaks, saying that he used to be an 'outsider' when he was younger. When Slug emerged from the polluted river, the Outsiders joined Batman in defeating him when Wildcat suffered a heart attack. With advice from Katana, Black Lightning and Metamorpho reactivated Wildcat's heart. Wildcat later trains the Outsiders in boxing. Wildcat later helps Batman fight Bane at the beginning of "Menace of the Conqueror Caveman!". In "The Golden Age of Justice!, is revealed to be a member of the Justice Society (a superhero team from the Golden Age that mentored both Batman and Black Canary in the ways of crimefighting). He and the other members of the Justice Society are shown to be quite protective of the current Black Canary, whose mother was the original Black Canary. When confronted by the current Black Canary about how they treat her like a child, Wildcat tells her about how her mother died in a fire when the Justice Society were rescuing people from a burning building. As part of her dying wish, Wildcat vowed to take care of her daughter. Reminded of her mother Wildcat realizes it is time he started treating her like an adult and the two team up to help Batman and the rest of the Justice Society fight the Society's old enemy, Per Degaton. During the battle, Per Degaton timewrapping staff briefly reverts Wildcat and the Justice Society to their younger-selves. With help from Batman, Black Canary, Wildcat and the Justice Society defeat Per Degaton and his minions.

Wonder Woman
 Voiced by Vicki Lewis

The princess of the Amazons. Wonder Woman first appears in the episode "Sidekicks Assemble!", where Batman is talking to the Justice League. Her next appearance is in "Scorn of the Star Sapphire!" where she rescues Batman and Steve Trevor from Baroness Paula Von Gunther and her army of robots. Her next appearance is in "Triumvirate of Terror!" where she and many other super heroes play a baseball game against some of their villains. Later in that episode, she, Batman, and Superman are trying to give some sort of object to a time capsule. Joker captures her and she teams up with Batman and Superman to defeat the trio of villains (Superman's Lex Luthor, Batman's Joker, and her archnemsis Cheetah), and still decided on something to give away for the Time Capsule afterwards. 50 years in the future, the trio of heroes now in their elderly days of life, finally decided on giving a boom box for the time capsule as it was revealed and they are still fighting crime.

Zatanna
 Voiced by Jennifer Hale

A female magician who uses backward spells. She teams up with Batman to fight Abra Kadabra.

Villains

1960s Batman TV villains
The villains from the 1960s Batman series appear as prisoners at Iron Heights Penitentiary in the episode "Day of the Dark Knight!" They are all defeated by Batman and Green Arrow when they try to escape. In "Mayhem of the Music Meister!" all of the villains above have brief cameos. Among these villains include:

 Archer - An archery-themed villain who is a modern-day Robin Hood that was played in the 1960s TV series by Art Carney. He made a cameo in "Day of the Dark Knight!" as an inmate trying to escape from Iron Heights Penitentiary but is stopped by Batman and Green Arrow. In "Night of the Huntress!", Archer made a cameo as an inmate trying to escape from Blackgate Prison but is stopped by Batman, Blue Beetle, and Huntress.
 Black Widow - An elderly lady with a spider motif that was played in the 1960s TV series by Tallulah Bankhead. She made a cameo in "Day of the Dark Knight!" as an inmate trying to escape from Iron Heights Penitentiary but is stopped by Batman and Green Arrow.
 Bookworm - A book-themed villain that was played in the 1960s TV series by Roddy McDowall. He made a cameo in "Day of the Dark Knight!" as an inmate trying to escape from Iron Heights Penitentiary but is stopped by Batman and Green Arrow. In "Night of the Huntress!", he was among the inmates released by Babyface at Blackgate Prison.
 Egghead - An egg-obsessed villain that was played in the 1960s TV series by Vincent Price. He made a cameo in "Day of the Dark Knight!" as an inmate trying to escape from Iron Heights Penitentiary but is stopped by Batman and Green Arrow.
 King Tut (voiced by John DiMaggio) - An Egyptian-themed villain who was played in the 1960s TV series by Victor Buono. He made a cameo in "Day of the Dark Knight!" as an inmate trying to escape from Iron Heights Penitentiary but is stopped by Batman and Green Arrow. In "Night of the Huntress!", Pharaoh makes a cameo trying to escape from Blackgate Penitentiary but is stopped by Batman, Blue Beetle, and Huntress. In "Battle of the Superheroes!", Batman and Robin wear special mummified suits to fight Pharaoh when he uses a special staff to turn people into zombies that obey his every command. With some pictures taken by Vicki Vale, Batman and Robin managed to defeat Pharaoh and freed his victims.
 Louie the Lilac - A flower-themed gangster who was played in the 1960s TV series by Milton Berle. He made a cameo in "Day of the Dark Knight!" as an inmate trying to escape from Iron Heights Penitentiary but is stopped by Batman and Green Arrow. In "Night of the Huntress!", Louie the Lilac made a cameo at a Crime Lord Summit in Little Sisters of Gotham Convent.
 Ma Parker - An elderly lady who runs a crime family and was played in the 1960s TV series by Shelley Winters. She made a cameo in "Day of the Dark Knight!" as an inmate trying to escape from Iron Heights Penitentiary but is stopped by Batman and Green Arrow.
 Shame - A cowboy-themed villain who was played in the 1960s series by Cliff Robertson.
 Siren - A female villain who can put anyone under her spell and was played in the 1960s series by Joan Collins. She made a cameo in "Day of the Dark Knight!" as an inmate trying to escape from Iron Heights Penitentiary but is stopped by Batman and Green Arrow.
 Zelda the Great - A female villain who is the associate of Eivol Ekdol and was played in the 1960s series by Anne Baxter. She made a cameo in "Day of the Dark Knight!" as an inmate trying to escape from Iron Heights Penitentiary but is stopped by Batman and Green Arrow.

Abra Kadabra
 Voiced by Jeff Bennett

A magic-talented supervillain. In "Chill of the Night!", Abra Kadabra is defeated by Zatanna and Batman. He is a foe of the Flash from the future who attempted to destroy him on multiple occasions. In one episode he came to believe that killing Flash would alter his own history, but ended up apparently changing the past by giving Flash knowledge that let the hero change his own future.

Amazo
 Voiced by Jeff Bennett

An android who can replicate the powers and abilities of various superheroes and supervillains. In "Triumvirate of Terror!", Amazo was a member of the Legion of Doom when they were playing a game of baseball with the Justice League International.

Angle Man
A supervillain who possesses the "Angler" which can alter objects and locations at the wielder's wishes. He is an enemy of Wonder Woman. In "Joker: The Vile and the Villainous!", he is briefly seen in a bar where the villains hang out.

Animal-Vegetable-Mineral Man
 Voiced by Dee Bradley Baker

A supervillain with the power to turn into any animal, vegetable, or mineral, or a hybrid of all three. He appears in "The Last Patrol!" trying to kill Negative Man and the rest of the Doom Patrol.

Arsenal
 Voiced by Fred Tatasciore

A man in a menacing green robotic suit with a sword that shoots lightning and has machine guns for hands. He also has a shield, jet boots, breathes fire, and shoots lasers from his eyes. He appears in "The Last Patrol!" trying to kill Robotman and the rest of the Doom Patrol.

Atomic-Man
A criminal that wears special lenses that enable him to focus his eye beams that can transmute one matter to another. In "A Bat Divided!", he made an appearance in the bar where the bad guys hang out when Firestorm and the three Batmen arrive.

Baby Face
 Voiced by Tom Kenny

A ruthless gangster with the face of a young child, but a manly voice reminiscent of Edward G. Robinson. However, when he is defeated, he whines like a baby, and he also wears diapers. He was defeated by Batman, Plastic Man, and Elongated Man in "Journey to the Center of the Bat!"

Baby Face returned in "Night of the Huntress!", now married to his sweetheart, Mrs. Manface, and fought Batman, Blue Beetle III and The Huntress when he sprang his crew from Blackgate Prison. After freeing the inmates there, he and his gang escaped. He then planned to break into "Warehouse X" to obtain the criminal weapons there. Batman, Blue Beetle, and Huntress tried to stop them, but ended up defeated and trapped in an hourglass trap that was previously used by Clock King. Babyface led his gang to Little Sisters of Gotham Convent (the peaceful part of Gotham), where a crime lord summit was being held, and ended up attacking them. Batman, Blue Beetle, and Huntress escaped and Batman used his transforming Batmobile to combat Babyface's robot while Blue Beetle and Huntress dealt with his gang. Batman managed to blow up Babyface's robot, defeating him. Babyface makes a cameo in "Mayhem of the Music Meister!" singing with the other villains in Arkham Asylum.

Hammer Toes
 Voiced by Gregg Berger

A member of Babyface's gang. Babyface raided Blackgate Prison to spring him out. He has large feet that are hard as hammers and spikes on the top of his toes. He is defeated by Huntress.

Lazy Eye
 Voiced by Will Friedle

A member of Babyface's gang. He has eyes that are lazy. During Babyface's prison raid, Babyface would not free him since he "can't have a look-out that can't do his job". When Lazy Eye commented that the gang has not been the same since Babyface married Mrs. Manface, Babyface grabbed him and started to strangle Lazy Eye until Mrs. Manface calmed him down.

Mrs. Manface
 Voiced by Ellen Greene

Babyface's wife, who has the face of a square-jawed man but the voice and body of a normal woman. When she tried to help Babyface, the hands on her robot were ripped off by Batman in the Batbot. When she asks if Batman would not hurt a lady, Batman responds by saying, "The Hammer of Justice is always unisex" and knocks her down.

Polecat Perkins
A member of Babyface's gang. Babyface raided Blackgate Prison to free him. He has abnormally offensive body odor, and is capable of knocking people unconscious. He is defeated by Huntress.

Skeleton Keys
A member of Babyface's gang. Babyface raided Blackgate Prison to free him. He has fingers in the shape of keys which are able to pick locks. He is defeated by Blue Beetle.

Tweedledum and Tweedledee
Twins with fat bodies that enable them to bounce. They are members of Babyface's gang when he raided Blackgate Prison to free them. Blue Beetle tricks them into attacking each other.

In "Legends of the Dark Mite!", Tweedledum and Tweedledee appear as an illusion in the 5th Dimension. They were knocked down by Batman who sent one of them toward the other villains.

They also made a brief cameo at Arkham in "Mayhem of the Music Meister!".

Bane
 Voiced by Michael Dorn

Bane is one of the most wanted criminals of Gotham City, one of Batman's enemies. A criminal who uses a special performance-enhancement drug called 'Venom' to enhance his strength. In "Menace of the Conqueror Caveman!", he battles Batman and Wildcat. He was at first seemingly incapacitated by a Batarang. However, he was eventually electrocuted to unconsciousness when Wildcat threw Batman's batarang at the cords which fell onto the train tracks.

Black Adam
 Voiced by John DiMaggio

An evil counterpart of Captain Marvel with powers derived from the Egyptian gods. Like in the comics, he is revealed to be Shazam's former champion who abused his power and was banished to another planet. Batman teams up with Captain Marvel to battle him and Doctor Sivana. Black Adam is betrayed by Doctor Sivana who absorbs his power and turns Adam into an old man. After Doctor Sivana is defeated, Black Adam disappears with Shazam fearing his return.

Black Manta
 Voiced by Kevin Michael Richardson

A criminal from the surface world who was hired by Orm to kill Aquaman, and is his archenemy. When Orm succeeds in capturing Aquaman and becomes "Ocean Master", Black Manta betrays and imprisons him. He planned to use a machine to destroy and plunder Atlantis, but was stopped by Aquaman, Ocean Master, and Batman. He was arrested and locked in Iron Heights. He appears again in the episode "Enter the Outsiders!" where he is robbing an armored car but is defeated by Batman and B'wana Beast. Black Manta teams up with Owlman and the other villains assembled by Owlman in "Game Over for Owlman!".

In "Night of the Huntress!", Black Manta makes a cameo as one of the inmates trying to escape Blackgate Prison. Black Manta had a reputation as even Deadman knew who Black Manta was and considered him a force good enough to kill Batman.

In "Mayhem of the Music Meister!" he teams up with Gorilla Grodd and Clock King to steal a communications satellite, but falls under the control of the title villain. In "Death Race to Oblivion!" Black Manta is one of the villains racing to rule the world.

Black Mask
 Voiced by John DiMaggio

A crime boss of Gotham City that wears a black skull mask. He appears in the episode "The Plague of the Prototypes!". His right-hand henchman is Taboo, and he commands the False Face Society. He and the society rob a bank when Batman leaves Gotham, but is foiled by his army of Bat-Robots. In his second attempt, Black Mask has Taboo reprogram the robots to do his bidding, and uses them to nearly defeat Batman, who is later rescued by Ace the Bat-Hound and the Prototype Bat-Robot (Proto). Black Mask later has the robots steal powerful explosives for him, and orders them to take out the rest of the False-Face society, except for Taboo. Black Mask plans to use the robots to set-off explosives and destroy half the city, intimidating the survivors. However, Proto tracks down his lair, and Batman captures the villain while he, Proto, and Ace take down the five robots. When a sixth robot is unleashed, Black Mask escapes and tries to detonate it, but Proto flies off and redirects it away from the city. Batman finds Black Mask and defeats him.

Taboo
 Voiced by John DiMaggio

Black Mask's right-hand man. He was the one responsible for hacking into the Bat-Robots and reprogramming them to serve Black Mask.

Blockbuster
 Voiced by James Arnold Taylor (as Mark Desmond), Kevin Michael Richardson (as Blockbuster)

A devious and evil child genius who can turn into that same villain by drinking a formula from S.T.A.R. Labs. He appears in the teaser of "Death Race to Oblivion!" where Batman confronts him at a museum to stop him from stealing a diamond called the Star of Bionya. The crowd objects to Batman grabbing Desmond until the boy drinks the serum that transforms him into Blockbuster. As Blockbuster, he subdues Batman. When Billy Batson steps forth, Blockbuster grabs him. When Blockbuster asks Billy if he has any last words, he quotes "Shazam" and transforms into Captain Marvel who manages to defeat Blockbuster.

Bouncer
A supervillain who wears a self-constructed suit of elastalloy that allows him to bounce from objects to evade capture. In "Joker: The Vile and the Villainous!", he is seen in a bar where the villains hang out.

Brain
 Voiced by Dee Bradley Baker

A French scientist that performed experiments on animals to raise their intelligence, but one day he was caught by an explosion, which destroyed his body. Only the brain survived, but Mallah rescued him, taking his brain and transferring it to a computer network that kept it functioning. He is an enemy of the Doom Patrol. In the episode "Journey to the Center of the Bat!" he controls Chemo and uses him to attack a Bialyan city. After Chemo steals and eats a nuclear missile, Brain makes his demands for the people to surrender. After Chemo is defeated, Batman looks for Brain and finds him in an offshore submarine. Batman falls on top of Brain knocking him on his side, immobilizing them both. After the Atom and Aquaman destroy the seed cell causing Batman's illness, Brain manages to stand himself up only for Batman to recover and defeat him. Brain later joins Owlman and other villains in a following episode, but is defeated in a psychic battle against an alternate universe version of Batman, who also has psychic powers. Besides his psychic powers, he displays a variety of weapons mounted on extendable robot arms, most of which proved ineffective once Batman was healthy again. He later appears alongside his sidekick and helper Monsieur Mallah and a few other Doom Patrol villains in "The Last Patrol!" where they target the Doom Patrol members.

Monsieur Mallah
 Voiced by Kevin Michael Richardson

A normal gorilla who was given genius-level intellect by the Brain. In "Gorillas in our Midst!", he allies with Gorilla Grodd and Gorilla Boss into replacing Gotham City's population with gorillas. He later appears with the Brain in "The Last Patrol!" where he and Brain are among the Doom Patrol villains assembled by General Zahl.

Brand
A cowboy-themed criminal. In "A Bat Divided!", he was seen in the bar where the villains hang out when Firestorm and the three Batmen arrive.

Bug-Eyed Bandit
 Voiced by Dee Bradley Baker

A criminal who can shrink in size and control bugs, and is an enemy of Atom. He makes a cameo in "Aquaman's Outrageous Adventure!" fighting the Atom on Aquaman's windshield before the windshield wipers get them.

In "The Criss Cross Conspiracy!", he ends up fighting Batman and Atom in small size until they get an unexpected help from Aquaman.

Bug Man
Avillain in a bug-shaped vehicle that can change shape. In "The Last Patrol!", he was seen in a flashback binding the Doom Patrol.

Calculator
 Voiced by Armin Shimerman

A heavyset middle aged man who works out business outcomes with supervillains. He lives with his mother in a suburban home. Batman and Huntress interrogated him about why Babyface sprung his old gang out. He tells them that Babyface is planning a break-in at Warehouse X.

He later appears in the Batman: the Brave and the Bold comic issue #6, only with a different look.

Calendar Man
 Voiced by Jim Piddock

When Bat-Mite was deciding which opponent to fight Batman, he tricks Bat-Mite into summoning Calendar Man, a criminal of Gotham City. Unaware of Bat-Mite's effect, Calendar Man is whispered to by Batman to take a dive. He does so, but Bat-Mite is not pleased. He upgrades Calendar Man into Calendar King with the ability to conjure henchmen version of holiday icons (like Jack O'Lantern Monsters, Santa Claus-themed bikers, uber-patriotic Uncle Sam, and mutant Easter Bunnies). After the henchmen and Calendar King are defeated, Bat-Mite sends Calendar Man back to where he pulled him from. In "Mayhem of the Music Meister!", Calendar Man makes a brief cameo at Arkham Asylum.

Cannoneer
One of the enemies of The Atom. He makes a cameo appearance in the episode "Sword of the Atom!" as part of a montage of the original Atom Ray Palmer.

Captain Boomerang
One of Flash's enemies who can throw explosive boomerangs. He makes a cameo in "Requiem For A Scarlet Speedster!".

Catman
 Voiced by Thomas F. Wilson

A supervillain that uses cat-themed weapons. He was originally a hunter who lost the pleasure of hunting, and turned to crime to get rid of boredom. In "Legends of the Dark Mite!", he tries to sell an endangered Sumatran Tiger to the highest bidding poacher, animal collector, and chef. Catman was then attacked by Batman. The poacher, collectors, and chefs end up fighting Batman. Catman released the Sumatran Tiger to attack Batman only for it to fight Ace the Bat-Hound. After the Sumatran Tiger was defeated, Catman was cornered up a tree and begged Batman to call him off. Catman was then sent to Blackgate Prison. He later appeared as an illusion in Bat-Mite's fantasy alongside the other Batman villains. Bat-Mite defeated him by turning him into a cat.

In Batman: The Brave and the Bold - The Videogame, he teams up with Catwoman to steal an ancient artifact to turn all the cops in Gotham into cats, and terrorize the city. At first, Batman and Robin are at odds over who they are pursuing: Catman or Catwoman, with Batman certain it's the former, while Robin believes it to be the latter. When they vandalize Wayne Manor, he attempts to seduce Catwoman, but fails, and becomes angry when the Dynamic Duo show up to stop them.

Catwoman
 Voiced by Nika Futterman

A cat-themed cat burglar. She one of the most wanted criminals of Gotham City. She is first mentioned in "Night of the Huntress!" in a conversation between Jaime Reyes and his friend Paco. She appears in "Legends of the Dark Mite!" as an illusion in the Fifth Dimension. She was bowled over by Batman when he sent Tweedledum and Tweedledee into the villains. She appears again in "Hail the Tornado Tyrant!" where she robs a nearby bank after Batman and Green Arrow thwart Joker's robbery. In "Inside the Outsiders!", Batman and Green Arrow are captured by Catwoman. She flirts with Batman, while he wishes she would rehabilitate, and a disgusted Arrow saves the heroes. After Batman captures Catwoman and her henchmen, she escapes while leaving Batman a "call me" note. In "Death Race to Oblivion!", Catwoman is one of the villains who are racing to rule the world. Utilizing a high-tech "Catmobile" equipped with various weapons and gadgets, Catwoman attempts to knock the Huntress out of the race by destroying her motorcycle. Unfortunately for her, Huntress outsmarts her and Catwoman ends up being taken out herself when her car is forced off a cliff. At the end of the episode, she and the rest of the villains are shown captured in a sphere created by Guy Gardner's power ring. She appears in "The Mask of Matches Malone!" along with Huntress and Black Canary. She also appears in "The Knights of Tomorrow!" in a 'what if?' story by Alfred Pennyworth, in which she and Batman fall in love and marry.

Cavalier
 Voiced by Greg Ellis

A criminal who dresses like a French musketeer and uses swords in battle. In "Night of the Huntress!", Cavalier makes a cameo as one of the inmates trying to escape Blackgate Prison. He also makes a cameo as one of the singing prisoners in "Mayhem of the Music Meister!". Another appearance is in "A Bat Divided!" where he is among the other villains hanging out at a bar. He was confused with amazement to see "Batman thrice" and soon was defeated by the Batman of logic.

Chancellor Deraegis
 Voiced by Enn Reitel

A leading bureaucrat from Morlaidh (home of the Katarthans) who was first seen in "Sword of the Atom!". He was xenophobic and protective of his people. Chancellor Deraegis's distrust grew when Ray Palmer entered Morlaidh. Upon discovering Ray Palmer's former home and research, he modified the lens to grow to the size of a human. With this power, he planned to take over Morlaidh and then take over Earth. Using the toxin from a poison dart frog, Ryan Choi managed to paralyze Deraegis and restore him to his normal size, after which he and his associates were arrested.

Cheetah
 Voiced by Morena Baccarin

A criminal that dresses up in a cheetah costume and is Wonder Woman's archenemy. She is one of the three villains that appears in "Triumvirate of Terror!" where she collaborates with Lex Luthor and Joker in a plot to take out Superman, Batman, and Wonder Woman.

Chemo
 Voiced by Dee Bradley Baker

A gigantic humanoid chemical monster, who was controlled by the Brain and attacked a nuclear plant where he encountered Batman and Aquaman. Batman ended up getting sprayed with some of his chemicals, causing him to mutate. As a result, The Atom and Aquaman are forced to go into Batman's body to destroy the chemical compounds. While they are doing that, Batman tries to stop Chemo from getting to the offshore oil platform, despite orders to not engage in strenuous activity by The Atom. After defeating the Navy, Chemo steals and devours a nuclear missile as Brain makes a transmission for the people of Bialyan City to surrender to him. Batman ejects from his Batboat before Chemo eats it. As Chemo attacks Bialya, Batman heads into him and eliminates the missile, before tossing a bat-bombs that breaks up Chemo. In "Clash of the Metal Men!", Batman defeats Chemo with the help of the Metal Men.

Chronos
A time-controlling villain and enemy of Atom (Ray Palmer). When Ray Palmer retired from being Atom, Chronos was not seen for a while. Some years later as seen in "Sword of the Atom!", Chronos resurfaces causing Ryan Choi and Aquaman to look for Ray Palmer. By the end of the episode, Ryan Choi returned to being Atom and helped Batman and Aquaman defeat Chronos.

Clock King
 Voiced by Dee Bradley Baker

A criminal who uses time/clock-themed weapons and tools. His costume resembles the clothing of British royalty and he has a clockface for a mask. His main enemy is Green Arrow.

He is defeated by Batman and the Green Arrow in "Rise of the Blue Beetle!". He appears in "Day of the Dark Knight!" trying to escape from Iron Heights, but was thwarted by Batman and Green Arrow. Clock King joins forces with Owlman and an army of villains in "Game Over for Owlman!". In "Night of the Huntress!", Clock King makes a cameo as one of the inmates trying to escape Blackgate Prison.

In "Mayhem of the Music Meister!", Clock King assists Black Manta and Gorilla Grodd in obtaining a rocket only to fall prey to the Music Meister. He makes a cameo in the same episode as one of the singing inmates.

In "Aquaman's Outrageous Adventure!", Aquaman helps Green Arrow fight Clock King. When they follow him into a restaurant, Aquaman telepathically communicates with the lobsters to help defeat the Clock King.

Tick and Tock
Clock King's henchmen.

Cluemaster
A criminal of Gotham City who leaves clues in his crime spree, though unlike the Riddler's, they were not riddles. In "A Bat Divided!", he was seen in a bar where the bad guys hang out upon the arrival of Firestorm and the three Batmen.

Copperhead
 Voiced by Dee Bradley Baker (Video Game)

A snake-themed villain of Gotham City with snake-like abilities and dressed like a snake. In "Legends of the Dark Mite!", he was seen robbing a museum when Green Arrow stops him. He also makes a cameo in "Mayhem of the Music Meister!".

Copperhead also appeared in Batman: The Brave and the Bold – The Videogame.

Crazy Quilt
 Voiced by Jeffrey Tambor

A criminal of Gotham City. In "Trials of the Demon!", Batman thwarts Crazy Quilt's art robbery before being transported to 19th Century England by Blood. Batman threatens to take him to Arkham Asylum during battle. His helmet fires red, blue, and yellow energy beams.

In a flashback in "The Color of Revenge!", Batman and Robin took on Crazy Quilt and his henchmen Red, Green, and Blue. Robin deflected a color beam shot from a Stimulation Emission Light Amplifier which blinded Crazy Quilt. Some years later, he escapes from Arkham Asylum and arrives in Bludhaven in a plot to get revenge on Robin. Crazy Quilt trapped Batman and Robin in a kaleidescope trap and trashed Robin's motorcycle upon escape. Crazy Quilt and his henchmen raided S.T.A.R. Labs to steal the Stimulation Emission Light Amplifier. He succeeds in stealing the device and captured Batman in the process. Robin manages to find them in an abandoned Bludhaven textile factory where Crazy Quilt has hooked up the device to his helmet. After freeing Batman, they fight Crazy Quilt where Robin knocks out Crazy Quilt. He is then taken back to Arkham Asylum. In "Mayhem of the Music Meister!", Crazy Quilt (without his blaster helmet) makes a cameo at Arkham.

Color Guard
 Voiced by Jeffrey Tambor (Red, Green), Sean Donnellan (Blue)

The Color Guard are Crazy Quilt's three henchmen. They consist of Red, Green, and Blue.

Deadshot
 Voiced by Tom Kenny

An assassin that appears in "Night of the Batmen!".

Despero
 Voiced by Kevin Michael Richardson

A red-skinned alien tyrant with a third eye that grants him psychic powers. He tried to hypnotized the entire Green Lantern Corps into serving him, but Hal Jordan trapped himself and all of the corpsmen in his ring, so Despero thought they all died. He later tried to control Mogo, a Green Lantern who is also a living planet, so he could hypnotize entire planets at a time, but he was beaten by Batman, Guy Gardner, and G'Nort.

In "Duel of the Double Crossers!", Batman uses a simulation of Despero to train the Outsiders.

Doctor Double X
 Voiced by Ron Perlman

Dr. Simon Ecks, a scientist of Gotham, discovered that human auras could be enhanced to function outside of the body. When Ecks created an energy-duplicate of himself, the Introverted scientist's unstable mind became dominated by the doppelgänger he named Double X and himself Doctor X, together they make Doctor Double X. Doctor X's energy-duplicate shares the consciousness of Simon Ecks, but can also act alone. The duplicate's powers of flight, energy blasts, and Super Strength. Double X requires regular infusions of electrical energy to sustain itself or it will lie dormant in Ecks' body. who can himself. Doctor X tries to create a radioactive meltdown to increase Double X's powers, but unknowingly creates Firestorm after he combines Ronnie Raymond and Jason Rusch. Unknown to everyone else, even him, he also split Batman into three parts. Doctor X later kidnaps Firestorm to absorb his radioactive energy, but the three Batmen rescue Firestorm and battle and drained Double X of his and threw him back into Doctor X's body.

Doctor No-Face
A faceless criminal. In "A Bat Divided!", he was seen in a bar where the bad guys hang out when Firestorm and the three Batman arrived.

Doctor Poison
An expert on poisons. In "Joker: The Vile and the Villainous!", she was seen in a bar where the bad guys hang out.

Doctor Polaris
 Voiced by Lex Lang

A blue-armored villain with the ability to control electromagnetic fields. He is enemy of Blue Beetle. Doctor Polaris attempts to rob a gold reserve, but is foiled by Batman. He appears in a gang of villains recruited by Owlman in "Game Over for Owlman!". In "Night of the Huntress!", Doctor Polaris makes a cameo as one of the inmates trying to escape from Blackgate Prison. In "Aquaman's Outrageous Adventure!", Aquaman sees Green Lantern fighting Doctor Polaris.

Doctor Sivana
 Voiced by Jim Piddock

A mad scientist and enemy of the Marvel Family. He, along with his children Sivana Jr. and Georgia, gained a portion of Captain Marvel's lightning which they used to summon Black Adam, who they teamed up with to steal Shazam's power from Captain Marvel. Sivana later betrays Adam by sending lightning at him and steals the power of the champion from him by sitting in Shazam's throne. Batman defeats him by tricking Sivana into saying "Shazam" to lose his powers, allowing Captain Marvel to defeat him with a simple flick. He later reappears leading the Monster Society of Evil.

Thaddeus Sivana Jr.
 Voiced by Jim Piddock

Doctor Sivana's son.

Georgia Sivana
 Voiced by Tara Strong

Doctor Sivana's daughter.

Doctor Tyme
A criminal with a clock-like head. In "The Last Patrol!", he was seen in a flashback where he had trapped the Doom Patrol in a giant hourglass.

Dwarfstar
One of the enemies of Atom. He makes a cameo appearance in the episode "Sword of the Atom!" as part of a montage to the original Atom Ray Palmer.

El Gar-Kur
A criminal from Kandor. In "Battle of the Superheroes!", El Gar-Kur attacks Kandor but is defeated by Batman and Superman.

El Sombrero
A masked wrestler villain that had a cameo in the very end of "The Knights of Tomorrow!".

Eraser
A criminal that dresses as a pencil. In "A Bat Divided!", he was seen in a bar where the bad guys hang out upon the arrival of Firestorm and the three Batmen.

Equinox
 Voiced by Oded Fehr

A mysterious villain obsessed with balance who tried to kill the Question and Gorilla Grodd as a part of life's goal to bring balance to society. Managed to escape Batman, foreshadowing his return in a later episode. Although he tried to destroy a villain to restore balance to the world he needed to destroy the Question to make sure that the power of good did not overpower the forces of evil. This makes him slightly neutral of villainy but is still considered a villain. What makes him odd is that he fell from atop a building into an alleyway, yet survived. Before he fell, he said that if Batman was to survive he had to also.

He starts a fight between Shrapnel and OMAC in "When OMAC Attack!" This time, he demonstrates reality-bending powers, such as turning Batarangs into real-life bats. After Batman sacrifices himself to deactivate a nuclear reactor, Equinox bring him back to life, stating that his death would unbalance the universe.

In "The Fate of Equinox!", it is revealed that the Lords of Chaos and Order gave him the magics of both light and dark when he was a baby and taught him, to allow balance, so that neither side could become more powerful. However, the pressure was too great and he snapped, going insane and believing he could do a better job without following his masters and followed a sense of balance that made sense only to his fractured psyche. When he failed to stop the Earth from rotating to make one half of the world bright and hot and the other half of the world dark and cold as his eternal example of perfect balance, he was killed but this merely released his spirit, allowing him to absorb the power of his old masters, making him all powerful. He tries to destroy and remake the universe in his own image using this great power. Batman, with the combined powers of Doctor Fate, Aquaman, Black Canary, Black Lightning, Blue Beetle, Fire, Flash I, Green Arrow, Green Lantern, Plastic Man, and Red Tornado bonded with him (known as Bat Monolith), fought Equinox. At one point it seemed the Bat Monolith had the upper hand putting Equinox on the defensive, but Equinox appeared to regain the upper hand. Bat Monolith found a way to defeat him when he made Equinox realize he was not in perfect balance because he hated his old masters, the magic of Chaos and Order inside him caused Equinox to begin to crack. Bat Monolith took the opportunity and punched Equinox into the energy he was preparing to destroy the universe with, destroying Equinox forever, or so it seemed.

Equinox, in a sense, returned in "Time Out For Vengeance!". It was revealed that when Bat Monolith destroyed Equinox, he shattered his body and mind into twelve fragments across time and space. The part of Equinox that represented his hate and thirst for vengeance found its way into a supercomputer. There, he commissioned squadrons of robots infused with his essence, and sent them across time to eliminate the Batmen of different time periods. Almost immediately, Batman dissolved into thin air, and Rex Hunter arrived at the Justice League station to tell them the bad news. He, Martian Manhunter, and the rest of the Justice League International set out to save the Batmen of the past; Guy Gardner and Ice rescue a caveman Batman, Booster Gold and Blue Beetle rescue the Batman of pirate ages, and Fire and Aquaman go to the Roman Empire to save the Batman there. However, past and present in this universe occur at the same time, and events of the future can also affect the present. When the robot Batman of Equinox's time is captured and tortured, the Justice League returns to find their Batman has not returned, and only Rex and Manhunter can remember him. The entire team, Rex excluded, go to rescue the robot Batman, but the remainder of Equinox's revenge squad is more than a match for them. Robot Batman summons up his will to break free, and an angered Equinox combines his minions into one massive robot, which his mind jumps into. Robot Batman uses his Batarang to overload Equinox's time portal generator, summoning the past Batmen who band together and battle Equinox. Equinox is obliterated, and in his wake his robots vanish and Batman returns to existence. However, the Justice League remembers that Equinox splintered into twelve fragments, and as such it is entirely possible that he could return.

Batman Revenge Squad
The Batman Revenge Squad are a group of robots who first appeared in "Time Out for Vengeance!". A fragment of Equinox ended up in the far future and inserted itself into a supercomputer where it created the Batman Revenge Squad to eliminate Batman from the timeline.

Evil Star
 Voiced by J.K. Simmons

An alien villain who can manipulate red energy with his Starband, and is an enemy of the Green Lanterns Corps. He fought against Blue Beetle in "Revenge of the Reach!" when he tried to rob a spaceship. Blue Beetle calls up his friend Paco and asks his advice to defeat Evil Star who tells Blue Beetle that Evil Star draws his powers from the stars.  After calling Paco for information on Evil Star, Blue Beetle used an electromagnetic pulse to create a space cloud to block Evil Star from starlight (the Starband's source of energy) and was able to defeat him. However, after that the scarab took control of Blue Beetle and before the scarab can cause Blue Beetle to finish off Evil Star, Batman intervenes. Blue Beetle and Batman then hand him over to the Green Lantern Corps.

Faceless Hunter
 Voiced by John DiMaggio

An alien without a face, and a violent outcast of his otherwise-peaceful people. When Starro comes to invade his planet, the faceless citizens find themselves immune to the Starro parasites. Faceless Hunter strikes a deal with Starro to destroy his own planet in exchange to work as his herald. He then travels to several planets, preparing them for Starro's destruction, eventually ending up in Earth. In "Clash of the Metal Men!", Aquaman encounters him who reveals that he is a herald of Starro preparing for his invasion by placing smaller Starros on most of Earth's heroes and in "The Power of Shazam!" he places many heroes under Starro's control. In "The Siege of Starro Part 1" he comes to put Batman under Starro's control. They both fought but the Faceless Hunter was winning as he could counter any weapon until Booster Gold arrived and saved him. He later fought Batman and B'wana Beast and found B'wana Beast's powers interesting. After Starro was killed he kidnapped B'wana Beast and uses his power to combine all the Starro parasites with Starro and formed a giant beast capable of destroying Earth. Batman then infiltrates his ship and Batman and Faceless Hunter fought but the Faceless Hunter was winning. Batman only defeated him by trapping him in one of his own weapons, but was unable to save B'wana Beast.

False-Face
 Voiced by Corey Burton

A master of disguise. In "Day of the Dark Knight!", he was among the villains that tried to break out of Iron Heights Penitentiary. In "Night of the Huntress!", he was among the inmates released by Babyface at Blackgate Prison. False-Face makes a main appearance in "The Golden Age of Justice!" where he was the real suspect to stealing the golden skull when disguised as an old lady. Being exposed, he attempts to retreat but is defeated by Batman and Detective Chimp.

Felix Faust
 Voiced by Dee Bradley Baker

A sorcerer with vast mystic powers, who plotted to open Pandora's Box but is defeated by Batman and Atom. He is later shown in "Day of the Dark Knight!" as an escaping inmate from Iron Heights but is stopped by Batman and Green Arrow. In "Night of the Huntress!", Felix Faust makes a cameo as one of the inmates trying to escape Blackgate Prison. He also makes a cameo in "Mayhem of the Music Meister!". Felix Faust plays a major role in "The Criss-Cross Conspiracy!", where he helps the retired Batwoman commit revenge against the Riddler by performing a spell that would switch her body with Batman's body. Felix Faust ended up being brought along for the ride to undo the spell and help defeat Riddler.

Female Furies
A group of female warriors that come from Apokolips.

Lashina
 Voiced by Nika Futterman

A Female Fury from Apokolips, who is a member of Mongal's team and had an interest in Jonah Hex.

Stompa
A Female Fury from Apokolips, and a member of Mongal's team.

Firefly
 Voiced by Robin Atkin Downes

A villain of Gotham City who uses a variety of light-based weapons. In "A Bat Divided!", he was seen in a bar where the bad guys hang out upon the arrival of Firestorm and the three Batmen. In "Emperor Joker!", he creates a rainbow monster to attack Batman and Robin but is defeated by Batman who was wearing a special bat-suit that can change color.

Fisherman
 Voiced by Dee Bradley Baker

A supervillain that uses fishing gear in his crimes, and an enemy of Aquaman. He was featured in a flashback holding a submarine over an underwater volcano but is defeated by Aquaman.

Flamingo
A contract killer who makes a cameo appearance in "The Knights of Tomorrow!".

Fun Haus
 Voiced by Gary Anthony Williams

During the holiday season, Fun Haus planned on robbing various homes using action figures he created called "Presto Playpals" when he was cornered by Batman and Red Tornado. He merged the action figures into a giant robot and attempted to destroy them along with the families he had robbed. Ultimately, he was stopped by Red Tornado who pushed himself to the point of self-destruction. In "Night of the Huntress!", Fun Haus makes a cameo as one of the inmates trying to escape Blackgate Prison. He also makes a cameo in "Mayhem of the Music Meister!".

Gas Gang
In the episode "Clash of the Metal Men!" it is revealed that the Gas Gang members were originally colleagues of Dr. Milton Magnus who died in a lab accident. They were reincarnated as living clouds of different gasses and they kidnapped Doc Magnus to make him create new robot bodies before they dissipated forever. Batman, after studying Platinum's memory files of the lab, revealed to Doc that they were using his resources to create a hybridized gas that can trigger volcanoes, so they can sell it to the highest bidder. During the battle between the Gas Gang and the Metal Men, they combined into a powerful combined robot form. They released all of their gasses at once to kill Batman, but he lit the gasses, causing a massive explosion. Unfortunately, the explosion fused the Gas Gang's gas forms together, turning them into an even more demented red gas cloud that can instantly evaporate solids. While Tin rescued Doc Magnus, Batman chased after the Gas and set his Batplane to self-destruct, destroying the Gas Gang once and for all.

 Oxygen (voiced by Brian Bloom) - The Gang's leader. He was originally a white cloud of oxygen later possessed a robot body shaped like an oxygen tank. He made Iron rust.
 Helium (voiced by Bill Fagerbakke) - A purple cloud possessing a blimp-shaped body. His gas can lift heavy objects. He also delights in making his enemies, such as Batman, talk in a high pitch.
 Chloroform - A yellow-green gas that induces unconsciousness, possessing the form of a walking cylindrical tank perforated with holes from which it emitted its gas.
 Carbon Dioxide (voiced by Hynden Walch) - A fiery gas being inside a bunsen-burner-shaped robot. She melted Mercury.
 Nitrogen - A freezing gas inside a robot shaped like an ice crystal.
 Hydrogen (voiced by Lex Lang) - A green gas inside a canister-shaped robot. Causes explosions.

General Zahl
 Voiced by Corey Burton

The archenemy of the Doom Patrol. In "The Last Patrol!", he brings his old enemies out of retirement by sending out some of their oldest enemies to kill them, including Brain, Monsieur Mallah, Animal-Vegetable-Mineral Man, Ir, Ar, and Ur, The Mutant Master, and The Arsenal (who is also Zahl's bodyguard). After Arsenal was defeated, General Zahl arrived in a ship and attacked Batman and the Doom Patrol with knock-out gas. Some minutes later on General Zahl's ship, General Zahl had Chief mention the real reason why the Doom Patrol broke up. It turned out that back in the Doom Patrol's last fight with General Zahl in France, General Zahl held a woman at gunpoint. Though General Zahl was defeated, the woman was killed. Now General Zahl reveals that he had planted two detonators on two nearby islands with the Doom Patrol deciding on which island to save with the choice being televised around the world. When Batman breaks free enough for the Doom Patrol to escape, General Zahl assembles the villains he had gathered. When General Zahl mentions that the actual detonator control is on his hat and activates it, the Doom Patrol are caught in the explosion while Batman used a knock-out gas on the other villains. General Zahl even mourned the Doom Patrol's sacrifice as he and the other villains are later arrested.

Gentleman Ghost
 Voiced by Greg Ellis

A ghostly criminal who is mostly invisible except for his white, Victorian-era clothes and monocle. Gentleman Ghost loots a city in the middle of a Day of the Dead celebration, and fights Batman and Plastic Man. But Plastic Man leaves the battle to "rescue" the stolen money and Batman has to fight alone. With a little help from Fire, Batman defeats him using Nth metal brass knuckles and handcuffs. Gentleman Ghost archenemies are Hawkman and Hawkgirl.

In a second episode "Dawn of the Deadman!", Gentleman Ghost manages to bury Batman alive, and later uses artifacts related to executions to revive and command an army of undead criminals to destroy London, England. However, he and his army is defeated with the aid of Deadman, Green Arrow, and Speedy. The vengeful army betrays Gentleman Ghost, and buries him along with them after Batman destroys one of the artifacts. In "Game Over for Owlman!", Gentleman Ghost is one of the villains assembled by Owlman.

In "Trials of the Demon!", Gentleman Jim Craddock has been using his magic to absorb the souls of women in the 19th Century and was setting up Jason Blood for the crime. He plans to use these 10 souls to free Asteroth. He briefly managed to fight Sherlock Holmes before Batman and Etrigan arrived. He manages to steal Holmes' soul to offer to Astaroth while Batman and Etrigan defeated an ogre he summoned. Astaroth granted him immortality in that his 'soul would never pass from Earth', making it so his soul would remain on Earth after death, however Astaroth did not make his body immortal, and Watson openly implies that he was executed for his crimes. At the end of the episode, Jim Craddock rises from his grave as a ghost vowing revenge on Batman.

Gentleman Ghost can fly, become intangible, and summon a skeletal horse; he also carries 2 pistols that shoot energy, and a cane that shoots energy from the skull-shaped cap and also has a built-in sword. His weakness is Nth Metal.

Giant Robot Jukebox
The Giant Robot Jukebox is basically just a big robot jukebox. It makes a cameo in "The Last Patrol!" in a flashback.

Gorilla Boss
 Voiced by Diedrich Bader

An executed mobster of Gotham City whose brain was placed into a towering gorilla. In "Gorillas in our Midst!", he allies with Gorilla Grodd and Monsieur Mallah into replacing Gotham City's population with gorillas. Gorilla Boss is defeated by B'wana Beast and Vixen, the latter of whom he taunts mercilessly because she is not as strong as him.

Gorilla Grodd
 Voiced by John DiMaggio

A super-intelligent gorilla criminal from Gorilla City. He has the strength of a normal gorilla, but he also wears a helmet that gives him psychic abilities. Despite occasionally fight Batman, his greatest enemy is Flash. He and his ape followers plotted to devolve the human race with an E-Ray from their headquarters on Dinosaur Island. They ran into conflicts with Batman and Plastic Man. With Batman devolved to an ape, Plastic Man helps the Ape-Batman fight Gorilla Grodd and his servants. When the E-Ray is activated, it evolved the humans back to their natural state. It even evolved Gorilla Grodd to a human who ended up incarcerated at Iron Heights in the end planning his revenge. He was later shown in "Day of the Dark Knight!" escaping Iron Heights (still in human form) and attempting to attack Batman, but stopped by Green Arrow. The original Grodd (now a gorilla again) joins Owlman and other villains in "Game Over for Owlman!" Gorilla Grodd and the Question are caught by Equinox in the teaser for "Mystery in Space!". Batman rescues Question, but leaves Grodd hanging by the flames.

In "Legends of the Dark Mite!", he is brought by Bat-Mite to face Batman, apparently reading a magazine when he was transported though upon seeing Batman, attacks him without question as to what happened. He is then traded to Solomon Grundy just as he is about to strike him. In Bat-Mite's fantasy, Bat-Mite in the role of Batman prevented Gorilla Grodd from stealing a device that would amplify his mental powers.

In "The Last Bat on Earth!", Gorilla Grodd forced Professor Carter Nichols to send him into Kamandi's future to lead the highly evolved gorillas after usurping Ramjam against the other highly evolved creatures. He uses a sonic cannon to disable the Tiger Men and uses a giant gorilla named Tiny to smash the gates. He is shocked to discover that Batman is here and sends the Gorilla Soldiers after him. Gorilla Grodd and his army faces off against Prince Tuftan and his assembled army of Lion Men, Bear Men, Snake Men, and Rat Men. Batman, Kamandi, and Dr. Canus then join the battle. With help from the Bat Men disarming the weapons, Batman faces off against Gorilla Grodd's army as he sics Tiny on them. Batman then faces against Gorilla Grodd who ends up trampled by the retreating Gorilla Men. Batman then returns with Gorilla Grodd to his own time. In "Mayhem of the Music Meister!", he assists Black Manta and Clock King into obtaining a comm satellite about to be launched only for the Music Meister to use the rocket for his own plans. In "Gorillas in our Midst!", he teamed up with Monsieur Mallah and Gorilla Boss to form G.A.S.P. (short for Gorillas and Apes Seizing Power) but is defeated by Batman, Detective Chimp, B'wana Beast, and Vixen. He briefly appears in "Requiem for a Scarlet Speedster!" where he was about to saw Batman in half, only for Flash to save Batman from the trap and knock out Grodd with one quick punch.

Tiny
A giant gorilla that was used by Gorilla Grodd to assist the Gorilla Men into defeating the Tiger Men. He was defeated by Batman.

Great Guru
An enemy of the Doom Patrol. In "The Last Patrol!", he is seen in a flashback where he tried to brainwash Robotman into being a pacifist.

Hook
An assassin with a hook for a hand. He made a brief cameo in "Dawn of the Deadman!" where he shot Boston Brand in a circus and is one of the supposed suspects to Boston Brand's death. He spotted in a brief body shot leaving the circus. Batman mentioned that he was investigating Deadman's death by trying to locate Bostan Brand's killer.

Hugo Strange
A mad scientist of Gotham City. In "The Knights of Tomorrow!", Hugo Strange was seen being taken down by Batman and Catwoman in a villain montage flashback.

Injustice Syndicate
An alternate Earth's version of the superheroes that Batman has teamed up with. They plotted to blow up Batman's Earth. Among the featured members are:

 Owlman (voiced by Diedrich Bader) - The Parallel Dimension's evil version of Batman, and leader of the Injustice Syndicate. Owlman uses the Phase Oscillator to scout ahead in Batman's dimension before invading it. After a scuffle, the Dark Knight locks him up. They end up switching places when Batman decides to stop the syndicate with Owlman imprisoned in the Batcave's cell. In "Game Over for Owlman!", Owlman escapes and frames Batman by committing various crimes while disguised as him. Owlman assembles Black Manta, Brain, Clock King, Doctor Polaris, Gentleman Ghost, and Gorilla Grodd to join him. With the heroes after him, Batman teams up with Joker. Owlman used Batman's computer to figure out weaknesses to capture Green Arrow, Blue Beetle, Plastic Man, Red Tornado, Atom, and Aquaman. When they end up captured, he negotiates with Batman to hand him the Phase Oscillator in exchange for their freedom. When it came to the fight with Owlman and his villain allies, Owlman allowed Joker to work on the wax trap. Batman revealed that he travelled to alternate Earths to round up the Batmen to fight the villains and free the captive heroes. Using a smokescreen, Batman managed to get Owlman and Joker trapped in wax. Owlman was returned to his dimension in bondage while the other villains were arrested.
 Blue Bowman (voiced by James Arnold Taylor) - Parallel Dimension's Green Arrow. He did not use the typical gimmick arrows used by his Earth counterpart and mainly used lethal varieties with razor sharp tips and explosive edges. Shares a name once used as an alias by Signalman.
 Dyna-Mite (voiced by James Sie) - Parallel Dimension's Atom. Blue Bowman had him spy on Owlman when he started to act suspicious to the Injustice Syndicate.
 Scarlet Scarab (voiced by Will Friedle) - Parallel Dimension's Blue Beetle. Scarlet Scarab shows psychotic tendencies, taking pleasure in terrorizing civilians, and claiming that he keeps the heart of an unnamed hero in a jar in his closet.
 Silver Cyclone (voiced by Corey Burton) - Parallel Dimension's Red Tornado. After the Injustice Syndicate's plan to invade Batman world is thwarted, and his teammates are captured, he attempts to set off his bomb (revealed to only affect organic life) on his own world. Silver Cyclone reveals that he hates organic life and wishes to destroy it, contrasting Red Tornado's desire to learn about and mingle with humanity. Red Hood stopped him by throwing one of his red aces into the side of his head, causing his head to blow up.
 Barracuda - An evil version of Aquaman who has the color pattern of Black Manta.
 Rubber Man - An evil version of Plastic Man with white hair and a black costume. His name was not revealed in the show, but rather in a toy based on him.
 Blaze - An evil version of Fire with blond hair and a red and black costume.
 Parallel Earth Wildcat - An evil version of Wildcat who was only seen in a flashback when Silver Cyclone was interrogating Red Hood.
 Parallel Earth B'wana Beast - An evil version of B'wana Beast who was only seen in a flashback when Silver Cyclone was interrogating Red Hood.

Jarvis Kord
 Voiced by Tim Matheson

The evil scientist uncle of Ted Kord. When his nephew Ted Kord became the Blue Beetle, he was unable to get the Scarab to work for him. Ted later asked Jarvis to unlock the scarab's secrets, but Jarvis decided to use the scarab to take over the world using robots based on scarab technology. Blue Beetle manage to stop Jarvis, and sends the Scarab somewhere else, which claimed his life in the process.

Later, Jaime Reyes (the new Blue Beetle) came to Science Island to look for the now deceased Ted Kord and ran into Jarvis Kord (who was posing as Ted). Jarvis managed to dupe Jaime to use the Scarab's powers to power up the beetle robots to help make the world "better" (which was a cover-up for his world domination plot). Jaime stumbled upon the beetle robots in Jarvis' but is ambushed by Jarvis in a large beetle-like exo-suit. Batman managed to disable his exo-suit as Jarvis commands his robots to attack. Batman managed to take some of them down before Jarvis forced him to surrender. Jarvis then prepared for world domination. Jaime helps Batman defeat Jarvis and overload the reactors to destroy Science Island.

Joe Chill
 Voiced by Peter Onorati

A mugger responsible for killing Batman's parents. In the present day, he is an arms dealer who sells weapons to super-criminals on the black market. When Batman confronts him and reveals himself, a terrified Chill asks for the villains for help, but they attempt to kill him for "creating" Batman. Batman foils the villains, but the Spectre manipulates the events so that Joe Chill dies when he ends up collapsed by debris as a result of Batman redirecting the sonic gun that was to be auctioned toward the ceiling. Though Batman got the debris off him, Joe Chill died in Batman's arms.

John Wilkes Booth
 Voiced by Dee Bradley Baker

A Southern man who was responsible for assassinating Abraham Lincoln. In "Mitefall!", the John Wilkes Booth from Parallel Universe 5501 attempted to kill that reality's Abraham Lincoln but is thwarted by a Multiverse-hopping Batman. It was soon discovered that John Wilkes Booth had a steam-powered suit underneath his clothes when he unveils it, in which guise he dubs himself "John Wilkes Boom". With help from Abraham Lincoln, Batman managed to defeat Booth by overloading his suit's valve.

Joker
 Voiced by Jeff Bennett

The most dangerous criminal of Gotham City. Batman's archenemy once teamed up with the Caped Crusader to defeat Owlman when the villain was upstaging his own crimes. He joined Owlman when he gave him an opportunity to kill Batman at last. During the fight, he and Owlman ended up trapped in wax. As Owlman was returned to his dimension in bondage, the Joker alongside the other bad guys were sent to prison. The Joker did comment that he enjoyed working with Batman before being loaded into the paddy wagon, restrained in a fashion similar to Hannibal Lecter in The Silence of the Lambs.

In "Legends of the Dark Mite!", the Joker appears as an illusion in the 5th Dimension. He was bowled over when Batman bowled Tweedledum and Tweedledee into the villains.

He appears again in "Hail the Tornado Tyrant!" where he is being tailed by Batman and Green Arrow. He was defeated by the combined efforts of Batman and Green Arrow.

He also makes a cameo at Arkham Asylum in "Mayhem of the Music Meister!".

The Joker appears again in "Death Race to Oblivion!" and "Chill of the Night!".

He also featured as the main villain in the episode "Emperor Joker!", where he acquires Bat-Mite's limitless powers and uses them to reshape reality in his image. However, when he is tricked into entering Batman's mind he finds himself in a world were Batman does not exist, meaning he is sane, and relinquishes his powers to escape.

He appears again in the episode "The Knights of Tomorrow!", which was entirely a fiction story written by Alfred Pennyworth where an aged, dying Joker trains a new successor in a plot of revenge against Batman.

He reappears in "Joker: The Vile and the Villainous!" and again in "Night of the Batmen!".

Harley Quinn
 Voiced by Meghan Strange (series), Tara Strong (Scooby-Doo! & Batman: The Brave and the Bold)

Joker's sidekick, who appears in the episode "Emperor Joker!". This version is a henchwoman of Joker, modeled after a 1920s flapper woman, shown in black-and-white, and does not sport her traditional costume, but Bat-Mite does. Though she has a mutual crush on Bat-Mite, she ultimately proves to love the Joker more.

Joker-Mite
 Voiced by Jeff Bennett

A small villain that Joker created with Bat-Mite's magic. He appears in "Emperor Joker!" as a henchman of Joker attempting to kill Batman, but then he later betrays him and tries to kill both Joker and Batman but is defeated by Bat-Mite and Harley Quinn. Joker-Mite is later taken to the Fifth Dimension by Bat-Mite to be his new nemesis after he gets his powers back.

New Joker
 Voiced by Jeff Bennett

The Joker's protégé in "The Knights of Tomorrow!". He is responsible for the deaths of Bruce Wayne and Selina Kyle in a story written by Alfred Pennyworth.

Jokers of All Nations
A team of villains assembled by Joker and inspired by him. It is made up of an unnamed Jokerized Inuit, an unnamed Jokerized Canadian Hockey player, an unnamed Jokerized Scotsman, an unnamed Jokerized Cossack, and an unnamed Jokerized Sumo wrestler. The Joker of All Nations attacked the headquarters of the Batmen of All Nations and were defeated by them.

Kanjar Ro
 Voiced by Marc Worden

An alien space pirate who was enemies with the alien Blue Beetle years ago, and managed to defeat him using a sonic-emitting Gamma Gong that the Scarab is vulnerable to. He returns to the same planet to capture the amoeba-like Gibbles because their bodies can apparently be used as fuel. He was beaten by the Jaime Reyes Blue Beetle in the first episode, after Batman fought and distracted him when Kanjar Ro got hold of the Scarab and Jaime used the Gamma Gong to remove it from the space pirate. In "The Super-Batman of Planet X!" Dr. Milton Magnus, The Metal Men, and Batman stop Kanjar Ro.

Killer Croc
 Voiced by Stephen Root

A crocodile-like criminal who is one of Batman's enemies. He appears in "Night of the Batmen!" assisted by Bane, Blockbuster, and Solomon Grundy in tipping a statue over but is defeated by Captain Marvel in a Batman costume.

Killer Frost
 Voiced by Jennifer Hale

The ex-girlfriend of Ronnie Raymond who gained ice-based powers. She crashes his class and attempts to kill him until Batman interferes. She battles Batman and Firestorm. They managed to defeat her and Killer Frost is taken into custody by S.T.A.R. Labs vowing revenge on Firestorm.

Killer Moth
 Voiced by Corey Burton

A supervillain who wields moth-themed weapons. At the end of "The Color of Revenge!", Batman gets a call from Commissioner Gordon that Killer Moth has hijacked the Gotham Bank Money Train. He appears in "Legends of the Dark Mite!" as an illusion in the 5th Dimension. Briefly appears in "Mayhem of the Music Meister!". He makes another cameo in "A Bat Divided!", and another in "Gorillas in our Midst!". Killer Moth make a major appearance in the teaser for "The Last Patrol!", where, in a flashback, kidnaps Batman and almost feeds him to an Atlas moth, before being rescued by Batgirl. The heroine then defeated him and his henchmen, making him the first villain she had defeated.

Moth Men
The henchmen of Killer Moth as seen in "Gorillas in our Midst!" and "The Last Patrol!".

King Cobra
A villain who is dressed like a cobra, leads a cobra gang and commits crimes. In "A Bat Divided!", he was seen in a bar where the bad guys hang out upon the arrival of Firestorm and the three Batmen.

King Kraken
A villain who makes a cameo appearance near the end of "The Knights of Tomorrow!".

Kite Man
 Voiced by Jeffrey Combs

As a young boy, he tried to recreate Benjamin Franklin's kite-flying experiment, but was electrocuted in the process. The shock affected his mind, and became obsessed with kites, becoming a kite-themed criminal. In a flashback, he is the leader of a group of thieves equipped with high-tech glider kites that allows them to commit crimes in Gotham City. Kite Man is stopped by Batman, and his former henchman Eel O'Brian (who Batman rescued from the vat of chemicals he fell in) testified against him in court, and was later arrested. Kite Man later appears in "Day of the Dark Knight!" as an inmate trying to escape Iron Heights, but was foiled by Batman and Green Arrow. In "Night of the Huntress!", Kite Man makes a cameo as one of the inmates trying to escape from Blackgate Prison. In "Legends of the Dark Mite!", Kite Man appears as an illusion in the 5th Dimension. Bat-Mite defeated him by turning him into a kite. He also makes another appearance in "Mayhem of the Music Meister!" as one of the singing prisoners. In "Long Arm of the Law!", he steals a sample of Plastic Man to complete a laser that will turn anyone with elasticity powers into stone, petrifying Plastic Man out of revenge for testifying against him in court. Due to Woozy Winks' tampering, the ray gains the ability to give objects Plastic Man's powers, while simultaneously freeing Plastic Man from his petrification. The ray then shoots both him and Batman, giving them elasticity powers. Kite Man and Rubberneck were defeated when the blaster they used turned them to stone.

Rubberneck
 Voiced by Jeff Bennett

A big and dimwitted rubbery villain. He first appeared in "Long Arm of the Law!" as Kite Man's henchman. He has super strength, great size, and a rubbery physical structure. He is ultimately defeated when Batman, who gains elasticity powers, knocks him unconscious, and is then tangled with Kite Man, followed by the ray hitting them, petrifying them both.

Kobra
 Voiced by Robin Atkin Downes

A supervillain who is armed with cultists. In "Requiem for a Scarlet Speedster!", Kobra is defeated by the Outsiders. Unfortunately, the Outsiders failed to destroy the bridge to prevent reinforcements from coming.

Kreegaar
 Voiced by Richard Green

The general of the Gordanian forces that invaded Rann to look for the Eye of Zared, a solar-powered doomsday weapon once used in a civil war on Rann. After Batman, Aquaman, and Adam Strange cause a solar eclipse to shut down the Eye of Zared, Kreegaar and his forces surrender. A Gordanian is seen in Duel of the Double Crossers fighting on War World.

Kru'll the Eternal
 Voiced by Michael Dorn

A caveman who was exposed to a meteor that made him immortal. With his immortality, he conquered lands, but his people kept dying out. In the present, he stole that same meteor that could grant someone immortality. He fought Batman and Booster Gold. He kidnapped Skeets, Booster Gold's robot sidekick to power his device. He has minions that are warriors based on the time periods that he lived through that he wanted them to be immortal also. In the fight against Batman and Booster Gold, he used his device to power up his warriors. After Batman managed to trap Kr'ull, he then used the device to make Kr'ull's henchmen too strong enough for the machine to overload and return them to normal. Kr'ull and his henchmen were sent to jail. In the future, he runs into Booster Gold's secret identity and ends up learning who he is. He is based on Vandal Savage and King Kull.

Trung
 Voiced by Jane Singer

One of Kru'll the Eternal's henchmen, who resembles an Amazon warrior.

Lew Moxon
 Voiced by Richard Moll

A crime lord who was responsible for hiring Joe Chill to shoot Thomas Wayne. Disguised as a priest in the present day, Batman visited Lew Moxon on his death bed where Lew admits to some guilt for leaving Bruce an orphan as the hit was only to be for Thomas Wayne and not his wife. Batman learned of Joe Chill's identity from Lew Moxon before Lew died. When Phantom Stranger brought Batman to the past where he encounters his parents at masquerade ball, he and Thomas Wayne fended off robbers led by Lew Moxon who crashed the masquerade ball. While in prison, Lew Moxon hired Joe Chill to dispose of Thomas Wayne which gave Batman a lead on who killed his parents.

Lex Luthor
 Voiced by Kevin Michael Richardson

Lex Luthor appears in the episode "Battle of the Superheroes!". He is Superman's arch enemy. He robs a museum and kidnaps Lois Lane but is thwarted by Superman and arrested by the police. When Lois Lane unknowingly receives a Red Kryptonite necklace, it causes Superman to turn evil causing Batman and Krypto to hold off Superman until the effects wore off. They discovered that the real Lex Luthor is at large having been the one who mailed Lois the Red Kryptonite necklace and that the one in jail was a robotic duplicate. When Lex Luthor tries to use his Kryptonite ring on Superman, it does not work due to the fact that Superman was actually Batman in disguise. Lex Luthor was defeated by Batman and Superman.

Lex Luthor appears in Batman: The Brave and the Bold issue #1 where he controls a composite monster that attacks Batman and Power Girl in England.

Ma Murder
 Voiced by Lauri Johnson

An elderly lady who runs a crime family. She and her crime family were on a crime spree in the teaser of "Menace of the Madniks" until they are stopped by Batman and Haunted Tank.

Mad Hatter
A supervillain that is modeled after the Alice in Wonderland character of the same name. He is one of the most wanted criminals of Gotham City. He made a cameo in "Day of the Dark Knight!" as one of the inmates trying to escape Iron Heights but is defeated by Batman and Green Arrow. He also makes a Cameo in Night Of The Huntress. He later appears in "Legends of the Dark Mite!" as an illusion in the Fifth Dimension. He was turned into a hat by Bat-Mite. Mad Hatter made a cameo in "Mayhem of the Music Meister!" as an inmate at Arkham Asylum. One of his mind control hats was shown on display in the Batcave.

Madniks
 Voiced by Dee Bradley Baker

A group of criminals who wear face paint and multicolored costumes. When Batman is shown fighting the Madniks, Booster Gold learns that they once fought Blue Beetle. Booster Gold goes back in time where he ends up helping Blue Beetle fighting the Madniks when they break into S.T.A.R. Labs to steal the Quark Pistol. When Booster Gold shoots the Quark Pistol, it ends up knocking them out. When Booster Gold returns to the present, he finds Batman fighting an energy monster and Batman figures out that Booster Gold was behind this. When Batman and Booster Gold end up transporting back in time to see Blue Beetle, they end up going to Hub City Penitentiary where the escape of the Madniks causes them to turn into Energy Monsters that drained energy from the electric fence. Batman, Blue Beetle, and Booster Gold end up pursuing the Madnik Energy Monsters to Hub City's Nuclear Plant. Batman and Booster Gold managed to reverse the polarity of the Nuclear Plant to return the Madniks back to normal.

Major Disaster
 Voiced by James Arnold Taylor

A supervillain that can command natural disasters like hurricanes, thunderstorms, lightning, and earthquakes. He attacked a seaside carnival demanding a high ransom but is defeated by Batman, Red Tornado, and Tornado Champion. His attack caused Tornado Champion to have emotions. Major Disaster later attempted to escape Blackgate Prison only to fight Batman, Red Tornado, and Tornado Champion again. When Major Disaster knocks Red Tornado into a bunch of wires, Tornado Champion fiercely attacks Major Disaster only for Batman to intervene. Major Disaster makes a brief cameo in "Mayhem of the Music Meister!".

Major Force
 Voiced by Fred Tatasciore

An enemy of Captain Atom who appears in "Powerless". He ends up stealing the Quantum Vacuum and uses it to steal Captain Atom's powers regressing him back to Nathaniel Adams. Then he drains the energy of a nuclear plant before engaging the other Justice League International members. Martian Manhunter states to Nathaniel Adams and Aquaman that Major Force defeated the Justice League International members that fought him. When Batman, Aquaman, and Martian Manhunter try to fight them, Major Force manages to knock them down causing Nathaniel Adams to take action and crashes a jet into him. When Major Force grabs Nathaniel Adams, the Quantum Vacuum overloads which ends up releasing the stolen powers. Upon regaining his powers, Captain Atom ends up defeating Major Force.

Metallo
A metallic archfoe of Superman with a Kryptonite heart that appeared in "Battle of the Superheroes!" where he got briefly defeated by both Batman and Superman.

Mirror Man
A criminal who uses mirrors in his crimes. In "A Bat Divided!", he was seen at the bar where the villains hang out when Firestorm and the three Batmen arrived.

Mirror Master
An enemy of the Flash who uses his power over reflections for evil. Mentioned in "The Golden Age of Justice!", and later makes a cameo in "Requiem For A Scarlet Speedster!".

Misfit
 Voiced by Dee Bradley Baker

An dwarfish enemy of Kamandi that appears. In "The Malicious Mr. Mind!", Misfit follows Kamandi and Dr. Canus to Batman's time and tries to take over the past. In "Joker: The Vile and the Villainous!", he fights Kamandi and the Tiger Men until Joker arrives to help Misfit.

Mister Mxyzptlk
 Voiced by Kevin Michael Richardson

A trouble-making imp that comes from the 5th Dimension and likes to annoy Superman. He is first mentioned in "Legends of the Dark Mite!" by Batman. Mister Mxyzptlk appears in "Battle of the Superheroes" where he causes mischief in Metropolis until Superman tricks him into saying his last name.

Monocle
A villain who makes a cameo appearance in "The Knights of Tomorrow!".

Mongul
 Voiced by Gary Anthony Williams

The dictator of War World, and an enemy of Superman. To bring more gladiators to War World, Mongul transports Jonah Hex from the past to capture Batman. Batman and Jonah Hex release the prisoners who chase after Mongul and Mongal. In "Death Race to Oblivion!", he paired up the superheroes and supervillains to race against Steppenwolf to determine the fate of the Earth.

Mongal
 Voiced by Gary Anthony Williams

Mongul's sister, who attempts to get Jonah Hex to leave but ends up tied to his robotic horse. She broke free just as Batman and Jonah had freed the prisoners, and she and Mongul were chased by them.

Monster Society of Evil
A team of villains assembled by Doctor Sivana to combat the Marvel Family.

Mister Mind
 Voiced by Greg Ellis

An evil and intelligent worm who is an archenemy of the Marvel Family and leader of the Monster Society of Evil.

Mister Atom
 Voiced by Dee Bradley Baker

A torpedo-like robotic supervillain in the Monster Society that appears in "The Malicious Mr. Mind!"

Ibac
A big wrestler villain that is another one of the Marvel Family's foes that appears in "The Malicious Mr. Mind!"

Jeepers
A giant bat-like creature that appears in "The Malicious Mr. Mind!"

Herkimer
A Crocodile-Man that appears in "The Malicious Mr. Mind!"

Oom the Mighty
An evil gigantic humanoid creature that appears in "The Malicious Mr. Mind!"

Morgaine Le Fey
 Voiced by Tatyana Yassukovich

An evil sorceress who tried to usurp her half-brother, King Arthur. She uses her magic to take over Camelot and Etrigan resulting in Merlin gaining help from Batman and Green Arrow. When it came to the location of Excalibur, Morgaine took control of Batman and turned him into a Dark Knight to retrieve Excalibur for her. Merlin engages Morgaine le Fey while Green Arrow is sent to stop Batman from claiming Excalibur for Morgaine. Batman was eventually freed from the spell. With Etrigan also freed, Morgaine transformed into a dragon. When Batman was not able to budge Excalibur, she attacked them and turned Merlin and Etrigan to stone. Green Arrow and Batman pulled Excalibur from the stone and combined their moves to defeat Morgaine le Fey by launching it into her chest, causing her to vanish in an explosion of light. It is unknown if she was killed by this or merely beaten.

Mr. 103
An enemy of the Doom Patrol. In "The Last Patrol!", he is seen in a flashback using a robot to fight Robotman.

Mr. Camera
A camera-headed criminal who uses cameras in his crimes. In "A Bat Divided!", he was seen in a bar where the bad guys hang out when Firestorm and the three Batmen arrived. The aggressive Batman punched Mr. Camera in the face which developed a picture of Batman's fist. He was seen again in the bar in "Joker: The Vile and the Villainous!" where he takes a picture of the Joker when he comes in.

Mr. Camera is also the main villain in an issue of the comic book spin-off. His real name is revealed to be Harry Sims and stalks and kidnaps Huntress on Valentine's Day. After becoming catatonic and imprisoned on Arkham Asylum, he discovers Batman's true identity.

Mr. Freeze
 Voiced by John DiMaggio

A scientist who was caught in an accident that made his body cold. He is one of the most wanted criminals of Gotham City. He wears a sub-zero suit to survive and wields a freeze gun. He appears in "Legends of the Dark Mite!". He appears alongside the other villains as an illusion in the 5th Dimension to which Bat-Mite calls him by his original name, Mr. Zero. Batman used his Batarang to deflate him. A robot of him appeared in "Sidekicks Assemble!" when Robin, Speedy, and Aqualad were training on the Watchtower. In "Chill of the Night!", Mr. Freeze is seen alongside other villains in an auction hosted by Joe Chill.

Mr. Toad
A villain who makes a cameo appearance towards the end of "The Knights of Tomorrow!".

Music Meister
 Voiced by Neil Patrick Harris

A supervillain whose hypnotic singing can control the minds of all who hear it, which often forces victims to break into intricately choreographed musical numbers. Appearing in "Mayhem of the Music Meister!", the Music Meister uses this power to enslave a selection of superheroes and villains, thereby creating a super-powered army. He reveals that his goal is world domination through simultaneous use of both these new minions and a satellite transmitter designed to broadcast his voice ("I'm The Music Meister!"). Batman, whose earplugs render him immune to the Music Meister's spell, intervenes and a chase ensues ("Drives us Bats"), but even he is overpowered by Arkham Asylum's controlled inmates. Meanwhile, the Music Meister becomes infatuated by Black Canary's singing voice, but when she spurns him and pines for Batman, he subdues her ("If Only"). The Music Meister then leaves both Batman and Black Canary in an elaborate execution chamber, although they quickly escape ("Death Trap"). Ultimately, the duo foil his plans ("The World is Mine!"). He appears once more in "Mitefall!" in the final scene, playing a piano cover of "If Only".

Despite being created exclusively for the series, Music Meister appears in Scribblenauts Unmasked: A DC Comics Adventure and is playable in Lego Batman 3: Beyond Gotham and Lego DC Super-Villains.

Mutant Trio
 Voiced by Fred Tatasciore

A trio of telepathically linked supervillains. They consist of Ur (the leader who has a giant eye for a head, fires a heat beam, and refers to himself as the Mutant Master), Ir (a faceless mutant with a giant eye on the palm of each hand and fires lasers), and Ar (Ur's brother whose face is in the center of his chest and fires a de-atomizer ray). They appear in "The Last Patrol!" trying to kill Elasti-Girl and the rest of the Doom Patrol.

New Gods of Apokolips
The New Gods of Apokolips are a group of villains from the planet Apokolips.

Darkseid
 Voiced by Michael-Leon Wooley

The ruler of Apokolips and the leader of the New Gods of Apokolips. He appeared in "Darkseid Descending!". He sent almost all of his army around Earth and wanted to turn earth into a second Apokolips. He had his army on Earth create a boom tube generator for him to arrive on Earth. He managed to end up arriving on Earth and ended up fighting Batman and his Justice League. After soundly defeating the League, Darkseid is goaded into a fist fight with Batman after the hero implies that he is simply a coward who hides behind his god-like abilities. Though Darkseid subsequently wins this fight, he and his army are sent back to Apokolips by the Question, who had infiltrated Darkseid's cadre of minions and reversed the Boom Tubes that had brought them to Earth.

Kalibak
 Voiced by Michael-Leon Wooley

Kalibak is Darkseid's right-hand man and son of Apokolips that appears in "The Knights of Tomorrow!". He alongside the Parademons hunt down Question after he discovers Darkseid's plans to invade Earth. In "Darkseid Descending!", he invades Earth to prepare for his father's arrival.

Mantis
 Voiced by Wade Williams

A humanoid insect from Apokolips. He attacked a cul-de-sac and ended up fighting Stargirl. Stargirl used her staff to forge a Bat-Signal to call Batman only to end up getting Blue Beetle. It took the combined attacks of Blue Beetle and Stargirl to defeat Mantis. In "Darkseid Descending!", Mantis takes part in the invasion of Earth.

Virman Vundabar
An expert strategist from Apokolips. In "Darkseid Descending!", he takes part in the attack on Earth.

Parademons
The foot soldiers of Apokolips.

Ocean Master
 Voiced by Wallace Langham

Aquaman's villainous brother, Orm has tried many ways to take over Atlantis. Here, Orm has returned to Atlantis after Aquaman gives him a second chance. After an attempted assassination on Aquaman's life is thwarted by Batman, the Dark Knight is hesitant to believe that Orm has turned over a new leaf. Later on, it is revealed that he is working with Black Manta to steal the throne from Aquaman, and he even succeeds in capturing his brother. Black Manta betrays him however, leading to the two putting aside their differences to save Atlantis. Orm is imprisoned in the end, and is forced to listen to tales of heroism from Aquaman. Despite what happened, Aquaman gives Orm another chance (because "they are family").

Penguin
 Voiced by Stephen Root (series), Tom Kenny (Scooby-Doo! & Batman: The Brave and the Bold)

A gentlemanly villain who uses a variety of umbrella weapons. He is one of the most wanted criminals of Gotham City. He appears in "Legends of the Dark Mite!" as an illusion in the 5th Dimension. He was bowled over when Batman sent Tweedledum and Tweedledee into the villains. He also makes a brief cameo in "Mayhem of the Music Meister!". In "Aquaman's Outrageous Adventure!", when Batman ends up captured and placed in a deadly drinking bird trap, Aquaman ends up coming to his rescue and gets shocked by the Penguin.  The Penguin reveals that his umbrella drones will spread a paralytic gas all over Gotham City. Aquaman manages to make contact with some crabs to free the family as the Penguin seeks his minions on Batman and the Curry family (Aquaman Family). Batman redirects the umbrella drones into the ocean and then pursues the Penguin. Upon catching up to the Penguin at his submarine, Batman manages to jam his umbrella with his cape and defeats him.

Per Degaton
 Voiced by Clancy Brown

One of the Justice Society of America's greatest enemies. He is revived from suspended animation by his assistant Professor Zee. When he attacks the city, he uses his spear to age Batman, Doctor Mid-Nite, Flash, Hawkman, and Hourman. He ends up being defeated when his spear backfires, turning him to an old man. After that, Per Degaton appears in the episode "The Siege of Starro! Part One" attacking White House in Washington, D.C. with an army of robots but he is stopped by the Justice Society of America.

Professor Malachi Zee
 Voiced by Dee Bradley Baker

Per Degaton's henchman. He freed Per Degaton from suspended animation. During battle, he ends up deaged into a baby.

Pierrot Lunaire
A mime-like villain that makes a cameo towards the end of "The Knights of Tomorrow!".

Planet Master
 Voiced by Stephen Root

A supervillain that has powers based on the planets, such as the "Strength of Jupiter", the "Speed of Mercury", the "Cold of Pluto", and the "Rings of Saturn". Aquaman teams up with Blue Beetle to fight Planet Master who was robbing a gold mine in "Aquaman's Outrageous Adventure!". Aquaman manages to redirect an artificial meteor right back at Planet Master, thus defeating him.

Poison Ivy
 Voiced by Jennifer Hale (first appearance), Vanessa Marshall (second appearance), Tara Strong (Scooby-Doo! & Batman: The Brave and the Bold)

A female supervillain with the ability to manipulate plants, and one of the most wanted criminals of Gotham City. She was referenced in "Rise of the Blue Beetle!" in a conversation between Jaime and his friend Paco. In "Chill of the Night!", she was at Joe Chill's auction for a latest weapon. When Batman showed up, she tried to defeat him, but was knocked out quickly. After learning that Joe Chill had "created" Batman, she attempted to kill him, and when the building started to collapse she, like the other rogues, left him to die.

In "Mask of Matches Malone!", Poison Ivy appears in a teaser in an attempt to take over Gotham as the "Queen of Crime". After Batman rejects her advances to be her "king", she orders her henchwomen to feed him to Georgia, her man-eating plant. Batman destroys the plant from the inside and Black Orchid shows up just in time to free Batman from Poison Ivy's grasp. With one punch, Poison Ivy is knocked out cold.

She later can be seen on a photo in "The Knights Of Tomorrow!".

She is later seen during the Joker theme song in "Joker: The Vile and The Villainous!" and also appears in the teaser for "Crisis 22,300 Miles Above Earth!".
 
In the episode "Mitefall!" she is seen during the end at a party.

Flower Children
The henchwomen of Poison Ivy who appear in "The Mask of Matches Malone!".

Polka-Dot Man
A supervillain who uses polka dots in his crimes. He appears in "Legends of the Dark Mite!" as an illusion in the 5th Dimension. Polka-Dot Man is defeated when the real Batman jumps in three dots in this uniform, causing him to shut down. He also makes a brief cameo in "Mayhem of the Music Meister!".

Professor Milo
 Voiced by Dee Bradley Baker

A talented chemist of Gotham City. In the teaser of "Gorillas in our Midst!", Milo uses genetically altered rats to rob a diamond depository, but they stole cubic zirconia gems that were implanted with tracking devices that led Batman and the Spectre to his lab. Milo used a potion to turn himself into a super-strong being, but Batman defeated him telling Spectre to let the police deal with him. When Batman leaves, Spectre returns and turns Milo's body into cheese so the rats can eat him.

Professor Pyg
A villainous doctor in a pig mask. He cameos in "The Knights of Tomorrow!"

Professor Zoom
 Voiced by John Wesley Shipp

The arch enemy of Barry Allen's Flash. In "Requiem for a Scarlet Speedster!", he was the evil ruler of the 25th Century upon being chased there by Barry Allen. So by using a time traveling treadmill, the other two Flashes Jay Garrick and Wally West and also Batman get there to stop him. He is eventually defeated in a speed battle with Barry Allen.

Punch and Jewelee
 Voiced by Diedrich Bader (Punch), Jane Singer (Jewelee)

A husband and wife team of criminals who use jester-themed costumes and gadgets. They are considered two of the silliest criminals active today by most superheroes. Batman stopped the two during a bank heist in "Menace of the Conqueror Caveman!". Booster Gold gave them his business card upon seeing Batman cart them off to police.

Psycho-Pirate
 Voiced by Armin Shimerman

Psycho-Pirate kidnaps the Outsiders (Black Lightning, Katana, and Metamorpho) and feeds off their rage caused by twisted nightmares. Batman goes inside their minds to save them, but Psycho-Pirate fakes his victory, and almost causes him to feed him rage by pretending to kill the Outsiders. Batman realizes this, and thinks positive thoughts, starving the villain, and defeating him. In "Mayhem of the Music Meister!" he is briefly spotted at Arkham Asylum.

Ra's al Ghul
 Voiced by Peter Woodward

The leader of the League of Assassins who manages to stay young through the use of his Lazarus Pits. In "Sidekicks Assemble!", he attempts to infect Coast City with mutated plants using his flying island. He is stopped by Robin, Aqualad and Speedy, but manages to get away. He later makes a cameo in the opening narration of "The Siege of Starro! Part One", where he and Ubu are foiled by Batman. In "Crisis: 22,300 Miles Above Earth!", he was seen planning to destroy the north, and was about to be foiled by Batman. He later knew Talia betrayed after she saved Batman and kissed him. He later appears at the end in an armor, he was about to finish him off, unaware Batman used his Batarang to attach his leg to a building, and used a Bat-Bomb to blow up the building falling off with Ra's along falling into an ice hole, presumely killing him.

Talia al Ghul
 Voiced by Andrea Bowen

Ra's al Ghul's daughter. In "Sidekicks Assemble!", she was disappointed that her father wanted someone else to be his heir instead of her. She secretly freed Robin, Speedy and Aqualad from their deathtrap and returned their gear so that they can help Batman, Green Arrow and Aquaman fight Ra's al Ghul. In truth, she did it because she was mad that her father intended to make Robin his heir, because taking over the family business is her job. Robin has a thing for her, but she stated that the next time they would meet, he was 'a dead man'. In "Crisis: 22,300 Miles Above Earth!", she started becoming attracted to Batman as she freed him, and kissed him, and Ra's realized her betrayal; she was later saved by Batman and suddenly fled when Ra's started attacking, before Ra's vanished to his death. It is possible that Talia must've taken her chances.

Ubu
 Voiced by John DiMaggio

Ubu is Ra's al Ghul's henchman.

Ramjam
 Voiced by Dee Bradley Baker

The leader of the Gorilla Men in the future where Kamandi is from. He and his Gorilla Men were at war with Caesar's Tiger Men community. When Gorilla Grodd came to the future, Ramjam was usurped by him.

The Reach
A race of world-conquering cybernetic insectoids, from the Blue Beetle scarab originates. The scarabs attach themselves to humanoid hosts and grant them amazing powers, until their true programming kicks in and they become the point men for a Reach invasion. During the Reach's attack on Oa, Jaime was able to resist the Reach's influence on him and the scarab armor. Three Green Lanterns then unloaded their energy reserves into the Scarab's energy core, which allowed Jaime to "poison" their programming when he shot tentacles into their armors and uploaded the energy into them. The scarabs released their grip from their hosts, ending the invasion of Oa.

Riddler
 Voiced by John Michael Higgins

A supervillain who uses riddles in his crimes. He is one of the most wanted criminals of Gotham City. In "Deep Cover for Batman!", Batman mentioned in his call to Commissioner Gordon that he halted the Riddler's "crossword puzzle crime spree". He appears in "Legends of the Dark Mite!" as an illusion in the Fifth Dimension. He was bowled over when Batman sent Tweedledee and Tweedledum into the villains. He also makes a brief cameo in "Mayhem of the Music Meister!".

The Riddler finally made an appearance in the episode "A Bat Divided!" when he hosted a game show called "Riddle Me This". Both Batman and Booster Gold were trapped by him. The Riddler started asking questions to Booster and for every wrong answer, Batman received an electric shock. Unfortunately for Batman, Booster was not very good in answering the Riddler's questions, but luckily Batman managed to escape at the last moment and help Booster defeat the Riddler and his goons.

It is revealed in "The Criss-Cross Conspiracy!" that he humiliated the heroine Batwoman during a battle by ripping off her mask upon being taken down and forced her to retire. Years later, she attempts to get revenge on him when she switches bodies with Batman with the help of Felix Faust.

Rogues
A group of enemies that often fight Flash.

Captain Cold
 Voiced by Steve Blum

An archenemy of the Flash that is armed with a freeze gun. Mentioned in "The Golden Age of Justice!" and appears in "Requiem for a Scarlet Speedster!" as one of the Rogues.

Heat Wave
 Voiced by Steve Blum

A villain of Flash that is armed with a flamethrower. In "Requiem for a Scarlet Speedster!", he teamed up with Captain Cold and Weather Wizard to form the Rogues.

Weather Wizard
 Voiced by Robin Atkin Downes (TV series), Corey Burton (video game)

A supervillain who uses a wand-like device to control the weather. In "Night of the Huntress!", Weather Wizard made a cameo as a client of the Calculator who tells Weather Wizard that he'll have the Flash out of Keystone City so that Weather Wizard can establish his next plot. He is later one of The Rogues in "Requiem for a Scarlet Speedster!" who goes on a rampage stealing from banks. Along with them, Weather Wizard expresses that he misses the supposedly deceased Barry Allen, and is happy when he returns.

Rohtul
 Voiced by Clancy Brown

A supervillain from the planet Zur-En-Arrh, a planet where Batman has superpowers. He is presumably the arch enemy of the Batman of Zur-En-Arrh. He first appears in "The Super-Batman of Planet X!" where he figures out Batman's super weakness and plans to use it against him.

He is based on Lex Luthor. His name is even "Luthor" spelled backwards and he is voiced by Clancy Brown who previously voiced Lex Luthor.

The Royal Flush Gang
This version of the Royal Flush Gang were depicted as a western outlaw gang. They tried to kill Jonah Hex, but he and Batman captured them. Their members include:

 Ace (Diedrich Bader)
 King
 Queen
 Jack (Edoardo Ballerini)

The Scarecrow
 Voiced by Dee Bradley Baker

A villain who uses a special gas to invoke his victims' worst fears. He is one of the most wanted criminals of Gotham City. He and Scream Queen plotted to ruin Halloween only to run afoul of Batman and Flash. He was defeated when the pumpkins Flash gathered buried him. In "Night of the Huntress!", Scarecrow makes a cameo as one of the inmates trying to escape Blackgate Prison. He also makes a cameo in "Mayhem of the Music Meister!" as an inmate at Arkham Asylum.

Scorpiana
A female villain in a silver suit that made a very brief cameo in "The Knights of Tomorrow!" (towards the very end).

Scream Queen
A female criminal who uses sonic scream attacks, by transforming the hood she wears into a mouth to attack. She and Scarecrow plotted to ruin Halloween but is defeated by Flash when he used Scarecrow's own fear gas on her.

Shadow Thief
A villain made of living shadow who can become two-dimensional. He was mentioned by Green Arrow in "Sidekicks Assemble!" where Green Arrow suspects that he is responsible for an approaching asteroid.

Shaggy Man
An android covered in thick brown fur. He was among the villains that Bat-Mite wanted to engage Batman in battle. In "Long Arm of the Law!", Batman and Plastic Man silently fight a tribe of Shaggy Men when it came to rescuing a group of boyscouts that the Shaggy Men captured.

Shark
An ordinary tiger shark was exposed to chemicals that gave him a humanoid appearance and a criminal mind. He makes a cameo in "Night of the Huntress!" amongst the inmates trying to escape Blackgate Prison.

Shrapnel
 Voiced by Greg Ellis

A Russian war criminal who was turned into an organic metal being through a lab accident. As Shrapnel, he continuously fights OMAC in a destructive battle arranged by Equinox. Shrapnel is driven by revenge. He claims to hail from a poor Russian village that was razed and burnt to the ground during an unspecified conflict, dooming the surviving inhabitants to poverty and famine. In this precarious state of mind, Shrapnel is exploited by Equinox coaxed into trying to set up a meltdown to burn New York City into a nuclear holocaust as a balance for the earlier loss of his people. He was defeated by OMAC and Batman.

Signalman
A villain who uses signals for crime. In "A Bat Divided!" he was in a bar where the other bad guys hang out upon the arrival of Firestorm and the three Batmen.

Simon the Pieman
A villain who is seen in "A Bat Divided!". He was at the bar where the other villains hang out, until Firestorm and the three Batmans came in.

Sinestro
 Voiced by Xander Berkeley

A stern Green Lantern who believes he is above the law. He helped Batman, Guy Gardner, and Gnort defeat Despero. He along with Gnort and Guy Gardner were freed from an Oan holding cell by Batman who was transported by Hal Jordan's ring to Oa to help the remaining members of the Corps after Despero seemingly destroys all the active members. He and the others empower Batman's suit for the job. Batman trusts him at first, but Despero reveals that Sinestro was in jail for destroying the Okaran warships, taking every living being on those ships with them. Sinestro then created a puppet government loyal only to him. He attempted to blow up Mogo, but is stopped by Guy Gardner, who imprisoned Sinestro in his ring at the end.

Slug
 Voiced by Alexander Polinsky

A mutant who lives in the sewers and manipulates people like the Outsiders to commit crimes for him. In the confrontation with Batman and Wildcat, Slug went head to head with Wildcat and was defeated by him. Wildcat then threw him into the toxic waste-filled waters. He emerged later on with tentacles and the ability to spew slime, and his personality twisted by the Outsiders' apparent betrayal. Slug was defeated when the Outsiders turned on him, and in the end was electrocuted by Black Lightning.

Solomon Grundy
 Voiced by Diedrich Bader

A gangster who was killed and rose again as a swamp zombie. This version's mouth is stitched together with 2 stitches, so he can only speak in grunts and growls, but his right-hand man Weasel understands his orders. He battles Batman and Black Canary when he and his gang threaten a scientist to give Solomon Grundy a new brain. In "The Color of Revenge!", he is seen robbing a bank in Bludhaven, but is defeated by Robin. Solomon Grundy appeared in "Legends of the Dark Mite!" to fight Batman before Bat Mite replaces him with Shaggy Man.

Weasel
 Voiced by Jason Marsden

A gangster who interprets for Solomon Grundy.

Spinner
 Voiced by John DiMaggio

A villain that wears a metal-clad uniform consisting of metal discs. In "A Bat Divided!", Spinner was seen in the bar where the bad guys hang out when Firestorm and the three Batmen arrive. Firestorm used his powers to destroy Spinner's outfit. In "The Criss-Cross Conspiracy!", Batman manages to thwart Spinner's robbery.

Sportsmaster
 Voiced by Thomas F. Wilson

A sports-themed villain who is particularly fond of exploding baseballs as a weapon. His real name is Lawrence Crock. He interrupts a holiday bowling tournament by creating human bowling pins out of the participants, but is defeated by Batman and Blue Beetle. In "Night of the Huntress!", Sportsmaster made a cameo as one of the inmates trying to escape Blackgate Prison. He appears in "Hail the Tornado Tyrant!" where he and two of his henchmen are robbing a bank, but is stopped by Red Tornado and Tornado Champion. He also makes a cameo in "Mayhem of the Music Meister!". In "Aquaman's Outrageous Adventure!", Aquaman sees Sportmaster driving on the road and sees that he's also on vacation with his wife and daughter.

Tigress
Tigress is the wife of the Sportsmaster. Her real name is Paula Brook.  In "Aquaman's Outrageous Adventure!", Aquaman sees Sportmaster driving on the road and sees that he's also on vacation with her and his daughter Artemis Crock.

Artemis Crock
The daughter of Sportsmaster and Tigress. Who decides she doesn't want to be like her parents so she became green arrows sidekick.

Squid Gang
A group of full-costumed criminals that have suction cups on the arms of their costumes to mimic the squid. They were the enemies of the second Blue Beetle. In "Fall of the Blue Beetle!", Batman was seen defeating them when Blue Beetle went to Science Island alone.

Starro
 Voiced by Kevin Michael Richardson

An alien parasite that resembles a purple starfish with a red eye in its center. A swarm of Starros attack the Challengers of the Unknown in the teaser for "Revenge of the Reach!". In "Clash of the Metal Men!", the Starros later invade Atlantis and take over the minds of Aquaman and the Atlanteans. In "The Power of Shazam!", the Faceless Hunter defeats most of Earth's heroes and places Starros on them. Starro himself appears later on in "The Siege of Starro! Part One", and at the end is apparently killed by Billy's repetition of "Shazam!" bringing lightning down of the alien. Faceless Hunter later abducts B'wana Beast and uses his powers to merge Starro's carcass with the other Starros to form a giant composite Starro monster.

Steppenwolf
 Voiced by Kevin Michael Richardson

A warrior from Apokolips. He is a member of Mongul's team and War World's champion fighter. He fought against Batman and other warriors in a match. He was defeated by Batman with help from Jonah Hex. In "Death Race to Oblivion!", Mongul has the heroes and villains race against General Steppenwolf to determine the fate of Earth. Steppenwolf lost to Batman which did not please Mongul.

Supreme Chairman of Qward
 Voiced by Wade Williams

A dictator who had oppressed the people of Qward. His soldiers ended up defeating the rebels led by Telle-Teg who sent a distress signal that was picked up by Batman, Plastic Man, and the Freedom Fighters. He arranged an ambush in his throne room where the lack of patriotism weakened Uncle Sam enough for him to disappear and leading to the capture of Batman and the other Freedom Fighters. Plastic Man managed to convince the inhabitants to stand up to the Supreme Chairman as he leads them through a televised version of "Yankee Doodle" which restored Uncle Sam while Batman freed himself. With the other Freedom Fighters freed, Batman, Plastic Man, Uncle Sam, and the Freedom Fighters managed to defeat the Supreme Chairman.

Sweet Tooth
A candy-themed supervillain. In "A Bat Divided!", he is seen in the bar where the bad guys hang out when Firestorm and the three Batman arrived.

Tattooed Man
 Voiced by Michael Jai White

A criminal who can bring his tattoos to life. In "Scorn of the Star Sapphire!", he was seen fighting Batman during a robbery until Hal Jordan arrived and helped Batman defeat him.

Ten-Eyed Man
 Voiced by Robin Atkin Downes

A villain with optic nerves attached to his fingers which he can see with, giving him a complete and enhanced 360 degree sight and limited periscope-like vision. His enhanced vision augments his Special Forces training, making him a superb fighter and marksman. In "A Bat Divided!", he was seen in a bar where the bad guys hang out. He later appears at the beginning of "Emperor Joker!" where he tries to rob a jewelry store only to fight Batman. Bat-Mite appeared during the fight while reviewing Ten-Eyed Man's history. Bat-Mite gave Batman a cactus causing him to defeat Ten-Eyed Man the same way that Man-Bat did to Ten-Eyed Man in the comics.

The Terrible Trio
 Voiced by Phil Morris (Fox), Edoardo Ballerini (Vulture)

Fox, Shark, and Vulture are bored millionaires who become martial artists that wear masks of the animals they represent. The real names of Fox, Shark and Vulture were originally Warren Lawford, Armand Lydecker, and Gunther Hardwick. As members of the Shadow Clan, they plan to steal the Wudang Totem from its respective temple, first killing off Master Wong Fei with a dart containing 7 different venoms. Batman and Bronze Tiger end up battling them to protect the Wudang Temple. When the Terrible Trio obtains the Wudang Totem, they turn into monstrous versions of the animals they represent. Attempting to take over Hong Kong, they are stopped by Batman and Bronze Tiger (who managed to use the Wudang Totem's powers to become monstrous versions of the animals they represent). They make a cameo appearance in "Mayhem of the Music Meister!" as three of Music Meister's victims.

Thinker
A failed lawyer who used his knowledge to take over organized crime. In "Sword of the Atom!", he was seen being defeated by Batman and Atom.

Tiger Shark
An oceanographer turned crime lord who operates at sea and on Gotham City's waterfront. He made an appearance in "Legends of the Dark Mite!" as an illusion in the 5th Dimension. He attacks Bat-Mite in the water. In "A Bat Divided!", he was seen in a bar where the bad guys hang out upon the arrival of Firestorm and the three Batmen.

The Top
A criminal with the power to spin at high speeds, and enemy of Flash. In "Return of the Fearsome Fangs!", he attempted to rob a bank but is thwarted by Batman. In "Night of the Huntress!", Top made a cameo as one of the inmates trying to escape Blackgate Prison. He also makes another cameo at Arkham Asylum in "Mayhem of the Music Meister!". In "Aquaman's Outrageous Adventure!", Aquaman sees Red Tornado fight and defeat the Top.

Tornado Tyrant
 Voiced by Carl Lumbly

A robot built by Red Tornado as a son, who became unhinged and evil after being hit with lightning by Major Disaster. Red Tornado shuts him down to prevent him from causing harm, but Tornado Champion rebuilds himself and renames himself as the Tornado Tyrant with the mission to annihilate mankind. He then goes to a beach and attempts to kill a lot of people there, but Batman and Red Tornado manage to defeat him with a scrambler device.

Toyman
 Voiced by John DiMaggio

An enemy of Superman. In "Battle of the Superheroes!", Batman and Superman defeat Toyman. Under the influence of a Red Kryptonite necklace given to Lois Lane, Superman threatens him. If not for Batman intervening, Superman would have killed him.

Two-Face
 Voiced by James Remar

A supervillain with a split personality. He is one of the most wanted criminals of Gotham City. He made an appearance in "Legends of the Dark Mite!" as an illusion in the 5th Dimension. He was bowled over by Batman when he sent Tweedledum and Tweedledee into the villains. In "The Fate of Equinox!", he has Batman cornered and flips a coin to determine whether or not to kill him. When the coin comes up on the good side and the henchmen attempt to kill Batman anyway, he ends up saving Batman's life. When flipping to decide whether he himself kills Batman, he is knocked out. In "Chill of the Night!", he is present at an auction run by Joe Chill. In "The Mask of Matches Malone!" he steals the cape of bast. later it is taken by Matches Malone aka Batman, then he becomes the crime boss in Gotham, till Batman comes back.

Ultra-Humanite
 Voiced by Jeff Bennett

In this show, Ultra-Humanite is actually a brain in a small mobile robotic brain jar that can possess the body of anything. He is a Flash's enemy In the final short of that episode called "The War That Time Forgot!", he took the body of a white Tyrannosaurus on Dinosaur Island. There, he mind-controlled the dinosaurs and used them to destroy allied planes in his bid to conquer the world. The Creature Commandos are sent in to rescue Batman who is being held captive on the island. During the ensuing fight the heroes manage to destroy Ultra-Humanite's mind control device which causes the dinosaurs to regain their senses. He manages to escape the other dinosaurs and make his way back to his base where he then retreats from the Tyrannosaurus body and back into his brain jar and runs for his life. He was last seen backed into a corner by the dinosaurs which have broken into the facility.

Weeper
 Voiced by Tim Conway

A villain who always weeps and cries when talking even when a hero is hit. Joker encounters him in the bar where the villains hang out. Joker learns how Weeper tried to destroy Gotham City but is defeated by Bulletman. When Batman unveils the Bat-Probe to thwart the criminals of Gotham City, Weeper agrees to help Joker. Joker had to regain Weeper's villainous touch. The two of them then attacked S.T.A.R. Labs where Batman had the upper hand on them until their fight is brought to the outside of S.T.A.R. Labs. Weeper could not bring himself to kill Batman causing Joker to fire a missile that Batman dodged. When the abandoned pizza restaurant is destroyed, Weeper ends up leaving Joker. With the Bat-Probe operational, Weeper returns and helps Joker get to the Bat-Probe. Weeper ends up fighting Batman and sprays him with tear gas before disabling the Bat-Probe. Weeper then turns on Joker to become the new King of Crime only for Batman to defeat both of them. When Joker starts crying in the paddy wagon, Weeper ends up laughing at this.

Wotan
 Voiced by James Arnold Taylor

An evil sorcerer who tried to steal from the Library of Eternity, but was defeated by Batman and Dr. Fate.

Zebra-Man
A criminal with diamagnetic powers and stripes running all over his body, hence his name. He appears in "Legends of the Dark Mite!" as an illusion in the 5th Dimension. Batman pulled off Zebra-Man's stripes causing Zebra-Man to become embarrassed and leave. In "Duel of the Double Crossers!", Batman prevents Zebra-Man from stealing an armored truck which was in violation of Zebra-Man's recent parole. He also makes a cameo in "Mayhem of the Music Meister!".

Zodiac Master
A criminal that wears a costume with astrological signs on it. In "A Bat Divided!", he was seen in a bar where the bad guys hang upon the arrive of Firestorm and the three Batmen.

Other characters

Abraham Lincoln
 Voiced by Peter Renaday

The 16th President of the United States who abolished slavery following the American Civil War. When attending a show at the Ford Theatre, he was assassinated by John Wilkes Booth. In "Mitefall!", the Abraham Lincoln from Parallel Universe 5501 is saved from assassination by a Multiverse-hopping Batman. When John Wilkes Booth activated his steam-powered armor, Abraham Lincoln helped Batman defeat him.

Alfred Pennyworth
 Voiced by James Garrett

Batman's butler, who has been a father figure to him even since his parents died. In "The Knights of Tomorrow!", it turned out that the events of this episode were part of a book that Alfred Pennyworth was working on when Batman came in stating that Catwoman is on a crime spree. Alfred did comment that Catwoman may be a good match for him yet.

Alpha-Red
 Voiced by James Arnold Taylor

Batman of Zur-En-Arrh's robot butler. His name is a pun on the name Alfred.

Barack Obama
 Voiced by Kevin Michael Richardson

The President of the United States. He made a special guest cameo in cartoon form at the very end of "Cry Freedom Fighters!". However, Plastic Man does not know who he is, which surprises him as Batman groans in disappointment.

Chancellor Gor-Zonn
 Voiced by Corey Burton

A chancellor and ally of Batman of Zur-En-Arrh, based on Commissioner James Gordon. He first appears calling Batman of Zur-En-Arrh telling him that Rothul's robot army is tearing up Downtown Gothropolis.

Commissioner James Gordon
The commissioner of Gotham City Police Department and ally of Batman. Gordon is one of the uncorrupt cops in Gotham. He calls Batman when criminals that he considers too dangerous for regular police to handle arrive.

In "Deep Cover for Batman!", Batman called Commissioner Gordon up telling him that Riddler's crossword puzzle crime spree was thwarted. In "The Color of Revenge!", a flashback showed that Batman got a call from Commissioner Gordon that Crazy Quilt had broken into the museum to steal the Stimulated Emission Light Amplifier. At the end of the episode, Batman got a message from him stating that Killer Moth had hijacked the Gotham Bank Money Train.

He is finally seen in animated form in "The Knights of Tomorrow!" where he is seen attending Bruce Wayne's and Selina Kyle's wedding. The events of this episode were all part of a book that Alfred Pennyworth was writing.

Dr. Will Magnus
 Voiced by Corey Burton

The creator of the Metal Men.

Great Caesar
 Voiced by Peter Woodward

The ruler of the Tiger Men and the father of Tuftan. He was displeased at the fact that his son had befriended Kamandi. Batman tries to persuade Caesar to let him help in his fight against Gorilla Grodd. When Gorilla Grodd's Gorilla Man army attacks, Great Caesar and those with him are affected by the Sonic Gates. He is then taken captive by Gorilla Grodd. After being saved by Batman and repelling the Gorilla Men, Caesar changes his opinions about the humans and thanks Batman upon giving the order to release the slaves.

Jimmy Olsen
 Voiced by Alexander Polinsky

In the episode "Battle of the Superheroes!", Jimmy Olsen plays a key role because Lex Luthor tricks Jimmy by sending him a new Superman watch. In this episode, Jimmy's main goal is to figure out Superman's secret identity. At the end Jimmy, Superman, Batman, and Lois Lane figure out Lex Luthor gave Jimmy (and Lois) the red kryptonite (which turned Superman evil) and take Luthor to jail. In "Triumvirate of Terror!", Jimmy Olsen is the commentator of a baseball game between the Justice League International and the Legion of Doom.

Lois Lane
 Voiced by Sirena Irwin

Lois along with Superman makes a cameo at Batman and Catwoman's wedding in "The Knights of Tomorrow!". Lois Lane appears in "Battle of the Superheroes!". She is first seen being captured by Lex Luthor but is saved by Superman. When Lois Lane unknowingly receives a Red Kryptonite necklace, it causes Superman to turn evil. When Batman visits her, Lois mentions that Superman saw another girl and Batman ends up analyzing her necklace to discover that it was Red Kryptonite. After she and Jimmy were rescued by Krypto when Superman attacked their protest march, Batman and Krypto had to fight Superman until the effects of the Red Kryptonite wore off. Lois and Jimmy were present when Batman and Superman found the real Lex Luthor since the one that was arrested was one of Lex Luthor's robotic duplicates. After Lex Luthor was defeated, Lois and Jimmy felt disappointed when Clark scored the story that revealed Lex Luthor's part in what Superman did under the Red Kryptonite's control, until they accepted Superman's apologies and Lois asks him out to dinner as they both smile.

Lords of Chaos and Order
The Lords of Chaos and Order are godlike beings. One side represents Chaos while the other side represents Order.

Merlin
 Voiced by David McCallum

A wizard and companion of King Arthur, the master of Etrigan, and the teacher of Morgaine le Fay. When Morgaine was taking over Camelot and took control over Etrigan, he traveled to the present and brought Batman and Green Arrow to medieval times after they prevented a break-out attempt at Iron Heights. He hoped to use them to retrieve Excalibur to help defeat Morgaine. When they reached the location, he engaged Morgaine le Fay in a magic battle. She then put Batman under a spell. When Batman broke free from Morgaine's spell, she turned into a dragon and turned Merlin and Etrigan into stone. Following Morgaine le Fay's defeat, Camelot was freed and Batman and Green Arrow were returned to the present by Merlin.

In "Trials of the Demon!", it was mentioned that he and Etrigan imprisoned Astaroth in the Underworld.

Oberon
 Voiced by Dee Bradley Baker

The short manager of Mister Miracle.

Paco
 Voiced by Jason Marsden

The best friend of Jaime Reyes. Unlike his comic-book counterpart, Paco is unaware of Jaime's dual life as Blue Beetle, and often belittles Blue Beetle in favor of other heroes. One example is shown in "Revenge of the Reach!", when Jaime asks him for help on how to defeat Evil Star, Paco assumes he was playing the Blue Beetle video game.

Perry White
 Voiced by Richard McGonagle

The editor of the Daily Planet.

Prez Rickard
The President of the United States fifty years in the future who opens a time capsule that Batman, Superman, and Wonder Woman contributed to.

Professor Carter Nichols
 Voiced by Richard McGonagle

A scientist with an experimental time machine. Gorilla Grodd forced him to send him to Kamandi's future.

Shazam
 Voiced by Jim Piddock

A powerful wizard whose powers can be tapped into by the Marvel Family.

Sherlock Holmes
 Voiced by Ian Buchanan

One of the world's greatest detectives, he was able to deduce much of Batman's life when he arrived in 19th century London because of a spell created by Jason Blood. With his partner Dr. John Watson, they solve cases. He also carries a cane with a sword hidden inside it.

Dr. Watson
 Voiced by Jim Piddock

Holmes' partner in detective work. He aids Sherlock in his cases, though Holmes does playfully mock him by telling him not to be an idiot when he guesses wrong many times. An example of one being a supernatural case when Gentleman Jim Craddock (prior to becoming Gentleman Ghost) was stealing souls in exchange for immortality from Astaroth.

Thomas and Martha Wayne
 Voiced by Corey Burton and Pat Musick (season one), Adam West and Julie Newmar (season two)

The parents of Bruce Wayne. One night when coming home from the movies with their son, they were shot by Joe Chill when Thomas tried to prevent him from robbing them. They appeared in a flashback in "Invasion of the Secret Santas!" (only Thomas spoke) and also appeared in "Dawn of the Dead Man!". The episode "Chill of the Night!" depicts more of their past as the Phantom Stranger takes Batman back in time to a costume party he and Martha attended. Batman notes the similarity of the costume he wore at the time to his present day costume. Batman and Thomas team up to take down some robbers working for Lew Moxon and Batman gets a lead in his case.

Vicki Vale
 Voiced by Gabrielle Carteris

Vicki appears in "Battle of the Superheroes!" shown covering a bank heist orchestrated by King Tut as well as the subsequent battle between the villain and Batman and Robin.

Vilsi Vaylar
 Voiced by Dana Delany

A reporter who works at the Solar Cycle Globe (Zur-En-Arrh's version of the Daily Planet) alongside Tlano, based on Vicki Vale and Lois Lane. She shows romantic interests in the two Batmen.

References

Lists of DC Comics animated television characters
Characters
Lists of Batman characters
Lists of characters in American television animation